= Gender inequality in China =

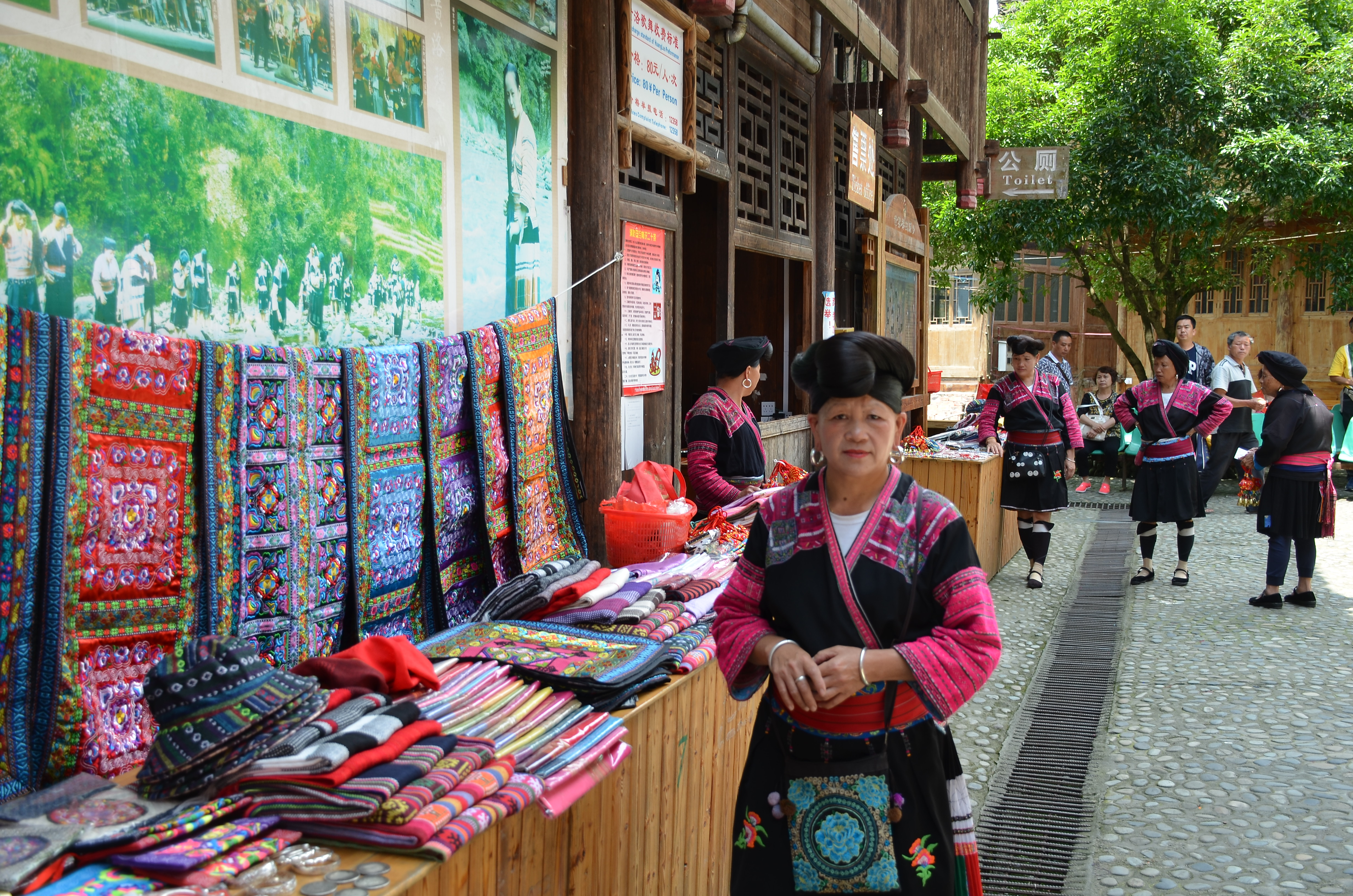
Zhuang woman in Guilin

In 2023, China ranked 41st out of 172 countries on the United Nations Development Programme's Gender Inequality Index (GII). Among the GII components, China's maternal mortality ratio was 23 out of 100,000 live births. In its education inequality, 68.3% of women age 25 and older had completed secondary education, compared to 77.9% of men. Women's labour force participation rate was 54.6% (compared to 75.6% percent for men), and women held 26.5 percent of seats in the National People's Congress.

== Before the Chinese Communist Revolution ==
Before the Chinese Communist Revolution, women were generally restricted to the traditional gender roles of wives, concubines, or prostitutes. Female oppression stemmed partly from Confucian beliefs about gender roles in society (such as filial piety), ideas which remain influential. Confucian discourses of filial piety presented the father-son relationship as the model of top-down relationships which reinforced patriarchal dominance in the family and hierarchical structures in lineage groups and communities. Wives were expected to be subservient to their husbands, kowtowing to their husbands.

Concubines had less choice than married women, and were kept as mistresses by men for sexual services or to produce children. Prostitution frequently resulted from women being sold into brothels by their parents. Legal during the Qing dynasty, there were few laws regulating prostitution; as a result, prostitutes were similar to slaves and lacked legal rights.

Marriage was defined loosely and encompassed wives, concubines, and slaves. Men were free to pursue sex from women in any of these three categories of "extended family". Women were prohibited from having sex with family slaves, a crime punishable by decapitation. Men were frequently polygamous (allowed one wife and an unlimited number of concubines), but women were permitted only one husband. This relationship between men and women in the household illustrated the power held by men in the family and their greater freedom compared with women. Women, for example, would generally lose social standing due to an extramarital affair. However, Qing laws punished both parties equally for premarital sex.

=== Foot binding ===
A noted repressive practice was foot binding. Foot binding originated during the Song dynasty, and was practiced by the wealthiest members of society in the 11th century. Over time, the practice increased and spread to the peasantry. Foot binding was intended to differentiate between upper and lower classes; it was considered attractive, with bound feet known as "golden lotuses".

It aimed to limit the growth of girls' feet, and began at age three. Foot binding eventually resulted in the arch of the foot becoming so angled that a woman was in constant pain and had limited ability to walk. Foot binding subordinated women to men in a number of respects. It was an essential component of marriage eligibility, since women often bound their feet to increase their chance of finding a better marriage partner. Men used foot binding to force women to be dependent; due to pain associated with walking, women were limited to household activities. Women with bound feet had considerable difficulty carrying out simple tasks (such as standing up from a chair without assistance) and a lower functional reach than women with normal feet. Foot binding encouraged the sexual objectification of women, since it fulfilled men's sexual desires and fantasies. It reinforced the ideology that women were useful only in sexualized, sedentary roles to satisfy men's desires.

Foot binding was such an established part of Chinese culture that the Emperor K'ang Hsi was unable to suppress the practice in 1650. Widespread anti-foot binding sentiment began during the late 19th century, and gained in popularity until the practice was outlawed in 1912. In 1997, the feet of 38 percent of Beijing women over 80 years of age and 18 percent of women aged 70–79 were deformed by foot binding.

=== Women's education ===
The purpose of women's education was to reinforce their subordinate status and ensure that they obeyed rules made by men. Women were taught social norms which restricted their rights and behavior. Only middle-class and wealthier women would receive an education, indicating a family's superiority. Women were educated at home by teachers who followed social norms. In the Eastern Han dynasty, four books were used for women's education («女四書» – Nü sishu) including: «女誡» – Nǚjiè by Ban Zhao, «女誡» – Nǚ Lúnyǔ by Song Ruoxin, «內訓» – Nèixùn or Nüxun by Empress Renxiaowen, and «女范捷錄» – Nǚfàn Jiélù by Ms. Liu, mother of Wang Xiang. These books reinforced norms which harmed women and restricted their daily activities. Even more recently, textbooks in China are still being used to reaffirm stereotypes and gender inequality. The three obediences and four virtues which were adopted by many women are part of Nüjie. The three obediences were "obey father before marriage", "obey husband during marriage" and "obey sons during widowhood", illustrating the subordination of women to men throughout their lives. The four virtues were "female virtues", "female words", "female appearance" and "female work", designed to fulfill the needs of men and society. Women's desires and needs were trivialized, and education became a tool to maintain male control of women.

A woman's personality was also restricted by this education. Women were taught to be weak and subordinate, respecting the men who dominated them. The physical differences between men and women as well were emphasized; men were seen as yang, and women were seen as yin. Yin and yang are the opposite of each other, and women were not allowed to physically interact with men outside of marriage. Women (as yin) were considered a negative element, reinforcing their inferior status, and were sometimes forbidden from leaving their room to demonstrate their loyalty. Obedience to men and elder relatives was the essential element of women's education. Women were powerless to resist, since society would not accept women who challenged men. As a socializing agent, women's education played an important role in shaping their image and maintaining their subordinate status for many dynasties.

=== May Fourth Movement ===
May Fourth Movement discourses challenged the traditional ideas about women, contrasting the idea of the "new woman" with that of the "traditional woman". The "new woman" reflected a secular world view, opposition to arranged marriage, and opposition to patriarchy. The idea of the "new woman" emphasised the urban and modern. May Fourth Movement discourses framed "traditional women" as rural, uneducated, and submitting to "feudal superstition". May Fourth literature often depicted rural mothers as participants in imposing arranged marriages and other feudal social constructs on their daughters.

== Mao era ==
During the planned-economy era of (1949–1978, also known as the Mao Zedong era), the Chinese Communist Party (CCP) sought to make Chinese women legally and socially equal to men. The Communist government attempted to challenge Confucian beliefs, and one of its main goals was to improve the social position of women by promoting their entry into the labour force. The constitution of the People's Republic of China, which was enacted in 1954, stated that women and men should have equal rights. To promote gender equality, the CCP promoted the slogan "Women hold up half the sky" to illustrate the importance of women to China's economic success. The CCP and the government implemented policies ensuring equal pay for equal work and equal opportunity for men and women.

In practice, however, wage inequality still existed during this era due to occupational and industrial segregation by gender. Enterprises typically divided their jobs into two groups (primary and secondary); men were more likely to be given primary jobs, and women secondary jobs. While women were entering the labour market, they were still expected to look after their homes and families. As a result, women were said to bear "a double burden" of work during the Mao era.

=== State feminism ===
State feminism refers to the state's support of women's equality in the public and work sectors through legislation, often progressive state laws to ensure gender equality. This state-supported feminism promoted employment opportunities for women in the public sector and provided benefits such as maternity leave and day care to female workers. State feminism also enforced laws prohibiting polygamy, the buying and selling of women, arranged marriage and prostitution.

Yang stated in her article, "From Gender Erasure to Gender Difference", that state feminism during the Mao era liberated "women from the traditional kinship patriarchy, but although women were catapulted into the public sphere of labour and politics, the feminist agenda was forgotten with the decline of gender salience and women's transformation into state subjects in a new masculine state order". According to Lisa Rofel, an American anthropologist studying feminism and gender studies, "The status of unfortunate widows (and their daughters) of poor families changed dramatically from 'broken shoes' to 'labour models' after 1949". Although state feminism provided some legal protection to women, it did not achieve gender equality. Gail Hershatter agreed: "The communist revolution didn't change the work women did. Women had always worked. What the revolution changed is the work environment and the social interpretation of working outside of familial context."

== Post-Mao era ==
=== Economic reforms and labour market ===
Changing employment policy was a major part of China's reforms after the Mao era. Under Mao China formed the Tong Bao Tong Pei employment system, a centralised system which created government-guaranteed jobs. Due to widespread unemployment after the Cultural Revolution, the CCP and the government phased out guaranteed employment and reformed the employment system as part of larger economic changes.

Reform took place in three stages. During the first stage (1978–1991), the existing framework was adapted: maintaining planned employment as the primary form of employment and adding a two-track system permitting government and private-sector employment. In the second stage (1992–2001), additional reforms continued to promote the market-oriented employment system while maintaining a degree of planned employment. In the third stage (after 2001), the reform process was accelerated to generate a market-oriented employment system in which private-sector employment was primary. Market reforms took China away from central economic planning and towards a system based on capitalist market mechanisms.

Although women gained significantly greater opportunities for work under the economic reform, they have borne a disproportionate share of its costs. China's market-oriented economic reforms undermined workplace gender equality by using migrant women as a cheap, flexible labour force. Migrant women make up a large proportion of factory workers, maids, and domestic workers, jobs which are prone to exploitation due to a lack of public scrutiny. However, migrant women are essential to the success of China's free-market economy; without their inexpensive labour, the country could not compete successfully in the global manufacturing market. Lacking strict government regulations protecting women's rights (partially due to the degree of corruption in China), gender inequality in the labor market continues to be an issue plaguing the country's free market system.

Since the economic reforms, the average real earnings of male professional workers have grown by 350 percent. Although women have gained working opportunities, the unparalleled growth in male salaries have widened the gender wage gap. The greatest (and broadest) increases in the wage gap occurred during the late 1990s, as the labour market shifted from an administratively-regulated wage system to a market-oriented one.

=== Education ===
In China, there is a strong male preference in relation to patriarchal norms. Male preference in society creates an inequality of women participating in the education system. Due to a higher rate of men in the education system, the average is that men acquire "1.3 years of education more than women". This is caused because in Chinese society there is higher pressure on men to do better in their education, which will then lead them to better and higher paying jobs that can support their family. This, however, leaves women at a disadvantage in regards to obtaining and having the motivation to pursue education. Gender norms in China create these certain pressures and attitudes to reasons why men have access to better and higher education than women.

There is also a significant amount of gender inequality in school. Textbooks are a main component of reinforcing and creating gender inequality in China. Within Chinese textbooks, gender stereotypes are promoted, especially in pictures. In younger grades, many pictures in Chinese textbooks include gender stereotypes, such as women pictured doing household chores, while men are pictured working at their jobs. Women are also portrayed as taking care of the house duties and children, while men are portrayed as firemen or police officers at work.

Although there have been recent developments of more women participating in STEM, they are still largely underrepresented, unlike their male counterparts. This is mostly due to lower motivation in women to acquire these positions because of gender stereotypes and discrimination in the education system and workforce.

=== One-child policy and gender disparity ===
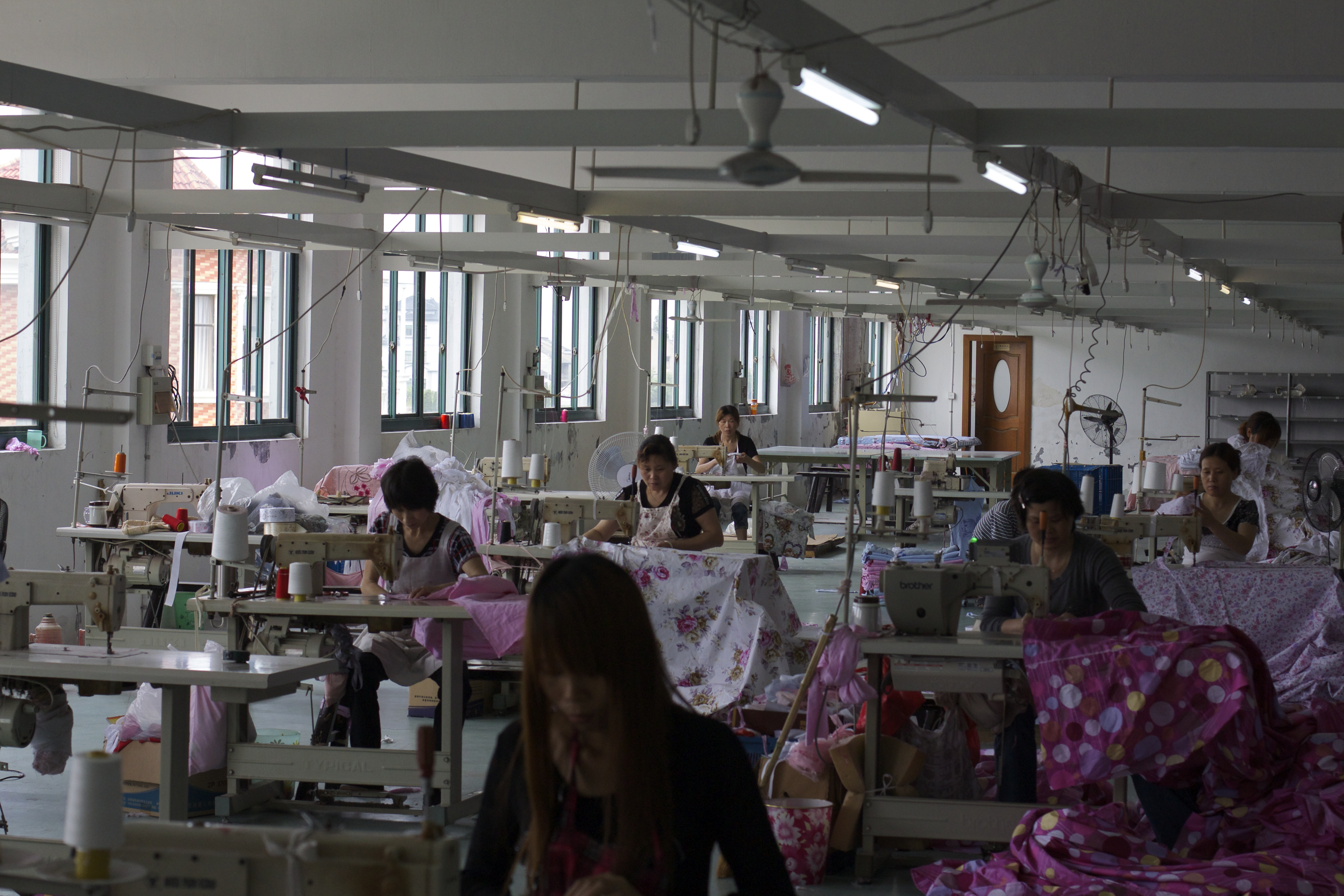
Female workers in a Chinese silk factory

Introduced in 1979, the policy set a limit on the number of children parents could have. Because parents preferred sons, the incidence of sex-selective abortions and female infanticide substantially increased. This has led to male overpopulation in China; in 2005, men under age 20 outnumbered women by more than 32 million.

In 2015, the one-child policy was abolished, and a two-child policy was introduced. Couples were encourage to have a second child, and the policy led to 5.4 million extra birth in China. Then in 2021, a three-child policy was introduced due to urgent needs to repopulate China. Families were told that they will be given better benefits and opportunities if they were to help contributed in repopulating the country.

In Chinese history, there has been a strong preference for sons, which is influenced by the patriarchal family structures. The preference for sons stems from various factors. Firstly, sons traditionally are responsible for providing financial support and care for parents, whereas daughters assume this role only when a son is absent. Secondly, men in Chinese society historically have made more money, inherited property, and continued the family line, leading women to be less preferred. The one-child policy is a primary factor in what started the preference for sons and gender disparity in China.

Gender disparity in China has been a complex and multifaceted issue with various dimensions, including demographics, social norms, and economic factors. A key aspects to be considered is the skewed sex ratio which led to female infanticide and sex-selective abortions. The imbalanced sex ratio has created a demographic challenge with a surplus of men, commonly referred to as the "Missing women" phenomenon. This surplus of men is expected to have social implications, including difficulties in finding spouses for a portion of the male population. Gender disparities are also present in economic opportunities and the workforce. While women make up a significant portion of the workforce, they often face challenges in career advancement and are underrepresented in leadership positions. Additionally, there is a persistent gender pay gap. Traditional gender roles and cultural expectations can contribute to gender disparities as well. In some cases, there are expectations for women to prioritize family responsibilities over their careers, which can impact their professional advancement. Although access for education has been improving for girls, challenges remain. In some areas, there may still be disparities in educational opportunities and resources between boys and girls.

== Workplace inequality ==
=== Wage inequality ===
China's social structure is patriarchal, which has led to wage inequality between men and women. This is largely due to gender attitudes towards women in the workplace. Cultural norms in China have a long history of preferring men over women, which also correlates into the workplace. The cultural norms rely heavily on men working to provide and take care of the family, therefore they are often hired and paid at a higher rate than women in China. Women's traditional gender role in China focused on staying at home and taking care of the house and family, while the men go and provide at work. These attitudes on women's gender role are still persistent in China today, and negatively affect the amount of jobs, work hours, and pay that women are offered, although China's state council along with country programmes have started to take actions to shift this structure into a more equal state.

Due to China's recent economic growth, there has been an increase in jobs, but a decline in women in the workforce. In the 1980s, women in the workplace made up about half of the force, but by 2017, the percentage dropped by almost 20 percent. The pattern of decrease is still prevalent today, due to discrimination, social norms, and traditional values implemented in the workplace.

Gender-based wage stratification has become a major issue in post-reform China. A 2013 study found that women are paid 75.4 percent of what men are paid (an average of RMB 399 per month, compared to RMB 529 per month for men).

According to the report, there is evidence of a significant increase in the gender wage gap in China's urban labor market during the late 1980s and early 1990s. The report highlights that there is a substantial difference between the wages of men and women, with a gap of 32%.

These statistics are in line with previous findings; a 1990 wage survey found that women earned 77.4 percent of male income in urban areas (RMB 149.6, compared to RMB 193.2 for men) and 81.4 percent of male income in rural areas (an annual average of RMB 1,235 for women and RMB 1,518 for men). These findings indicate that the income gap has not been closing in China, and wage inequality may be on the rise. Two-thirds of this differential has been attributed to unequal pay for the same work. Part of the difference results from higher-quality skills acquired by men through better educational opportunities, managerial positions, and previous work experience. Since women have limited opportunity to develop the education or skills necessary to obtain higher-level jobs, they are often paid less for their work; female entrepreneurs are denied access to the networking opportunities of their male counterparts. A number of factors have contributed to the rise in wage inequality in China.

Educational background and profession have been identified as two main factors of an increased gender wage gap, and regional impacts have been recognized as a major cause of the increasing wage inequality. Women in the workplace still face discrimination, and are discouraged from applying for managerial and highly-paid jobs. The high end of most sectors is still male-dominated, and business events often include the sexual objectification of women. In Chinese business culture, deals and partnerships are made through evenings of banqueting, going to KTV bars and drinking. Female hostesses (and sometimes prostitutes) play an important role in the success of these gatherings, highlighting the businessmen's masculinity. Due to the sexualized nature of these events, female entrepreneurs are frequently discouraged from (or uncomfortable attending) these networking evenings. As a result, businesswomen have less access to the networks of government officials, business partners, and underworld organizations which are crucial to entrepreneurial success in China.

A main factor in the Hong Kong gender wage gap is age. More men achieve superior positions in a job because women leave the job market earlier to take care of their family. Men remain in the job market longer, allowing for more raises and better jobs. Women in their 30s earn 11 per cent less on average than their male counterparts, and the gap increases with age; women over 60 earn an average of HK$322,000, about half the HK$618,000 earned by men. Although the wage gap has narrowed, there is room for improvement. Gender-based wage inequality will be a major factor in pay decisions because of inclusion and diversity (I&D) programs; thirteen percent of Asia-Pacific employers have I&D programs.

As of 2023, Chinese women earn US$11,000 less than men based on 2021 purchasing power parity, representing a 41 percent gap. As of 2025, the World Economic Forum ranks China 31st out of 148 countries in wage inequality, ranking ahead of the United States at 40th, the United Kingdom at 54th, Japan at 93rd and South Korea at 94th.

=== Occupational segregation ===
Feminization of informal sector employment and devaluation of female-dominated occupations are two new labor-market trends since China's economic reforms. A survey of seven provinces and eleven cities found that gender segregation increased in forty-four out of fifty-one examined occupations between 1985 and 2000, and women were restricted from entering a larger number of professional occupations based on their gender. They were barred from more white-collar jobs than blue-collar ones, demonstrating the difficulty women have in obtaining higher-level jobs. One impact of gendered jobs is lower wages for women, illustrated by the lower average incomes of female-dominated enterprises compared to male-dominated ones. During the early 1990s, an increase in the number of female employees in the sales and service industries was accompanied by a reduction in the average income of these sectors. Data from the same time period indicates an inverse relationship between the proportion of women employed at an institution and the average wage of the institution's employees.

=== Beauty economy ===
The "beauty economy" refers to companies using attractive young women to increase profits. The women used to promote goods and services are generally known as pink-collar workers. These women can be found at car shows and company booths at conventions, and in publishing, insurance, and real-estate development. The beauty economy is a marked shift from Mao-era attitudes in which sexuality was subdued to promote gender equality. In 21st-century China, sexuality is promoted in capitalist endeavors. Although many women involved in the beauty economy hold relatively-mundane jobs, others are involved in legally-complicated endeavors as "grey women": mistresses and hostesses who cater to a rich clientele. These women are selling their sexuality (sometimes including their bodies) as a consumable good in the capitalist economy. The close relationship between hypersexualized grey women and the business world has made extramarital affairs common amongst Chinese businessmen. This highly publicized trend has created a new market for aging wives of products to remain youthful and (ideally) keep their husbands faithful. In 2004, China had the world's eighth-largest cosmetics market in the world and Asia's second-largest. The beauty economy has set high standards for physical appearance, encouraging women to consume youth-preserving products and promoting ageism.

=== Unemployment ===
During the state-owned enterprise (SOE) reforms of the late 1990s, women were laid off in greater numbers and received larger pay cuts than men. Female-dominated industries, such as textiles and other light industry, were affected greatly by the reforms and many women lost their jobs; employees in secondary jobs were laid off in greater numbers than those in primary jobs. Since women occupied a high proportion of secondary jobs, they were the first to be laid off during the economic downturn; women were also forced to retire at a younger age than men. The government-mandated retirement age for women was generally five years younger than that for men, but internal retirement ages (determined by individual enterprises) were even lower for women. Enterprises which laid off the most workers had performed poorly and were unable to survive in the new market economy; they also employed a larger proportion of women than men. When the companies went under, larger numbers of women than men were unemployed.

=== Hiring discrimination ===
During the market-oriented reforms, there was widespread evidence of employment discrimination in hiring. Sexism in recruitment takes two forms: explicit and hidden. Explicit gender discrimination refers to directly stated restrictions on women in the recruitment process, and hidden discrimination occurs primarily in the preferential hiring of men. Contemporary China has three general types of gender-based hiring discrimination. Gender restrictions on careers and jobs create an environment where women are only welcomed into careers which match traditional female roles: primarily domestic, secretarial, or factory work. Gender discrimination also affects women of reproductive age, who are frequently passed over due to a potential future loss of productivity resulting from pregnancy. Ageism affects many women, especially those working in the service industry (where youth is a key component of workplace success). In this sector, women over age 30 are frequently denied jobs. Female job-seekers over age 40 are especially subject to ageism in most industries, despite being past child-bearing age. The age limit for men is more relaxed, usually 40 or 45 years of age. Although laws are in place to prevent hiring discrimination, there is little enforcement.

=== Impact of foreign direct investment on wages ===
Foreign direct investment (FDI) has significantly impacted employment in China. The number of employees hired by foreign direct investment enterprises in the country's urban areas increased steadily from 1985 to 2005; between 2002 and 2005, the number of employees hired by FDI enterprises in urban China increased by 5.95 million. FDI is mainly driven by China's low cost of labor. A considerable number of foreign-invested enterprises are based in labor-intensive industries such as the garment industry, electronics manufacturing, and the food and beverage processing industry.

FDI has disproportionately affected women, who frequently hold low-skill, low-paying factory jobs funded by foreign investment. A 2000 study found that 62.1 percent of FDI-employed workers were female. Wages by gender have been inconsistently affected by FDI, with pay equality in FDI industries increasing in 1995 and decreasing in 2005. This shift may be caused by increased FDI investment in production, resulting in additional low-paying factory jobs which are predominantly filled by women.

== Confucianism and gender ==
Confucianism provided a framework which judged individuals by their faithfulness and adherence to social norms dictated by ancient customs. Men were evaluated according to how well they fulfilled their social positions as husbands, fathers, sons or servants. Correspondingly, women were valued based on their conduct as wives, mothers and daughters. Mainly assigned household activities, women were considered less important and therefore inferior.

During the late 12th century, neo-Confucian scholar Zhu Xi advocated the "three bonds" between ruler and subject, father and son, and husband and wife. Husbands were granted power over their wives through the Confucian emphasis on sexual differentiation as key to maintaining societal harmony. While husbands ruled the "external world", women operated in the "internal world" by running the household; however, women lacked power in society. Although women held executive power in the household, their influence rarely rivaled that of men in the public sphere. Confucian values indicated, and reinforced, a clear hierarchy. Women were subordinate to men—particularly young women, who were on the lowest level of this hierarchy.

In Confucian Chinese culture, women's identities were often oppressed; the deeply-rooted Confucian teachings which shaped Chinese culture and values reinforced a patriarchal family unit that devalued women. A daughter was seen as a temporary member of her father's side of the family, since she would leave the family at marriage. This notion of family abandonment is reflected in Magarey Wolf's statement in "Uterine Families and the Women's Community" that "when a young woman marries, her formal ties with the household of her father are severed ... that she, like the water, may never return". In Chinese Confucian society, a woman's identity is subordinated and she is barely recognized as a person.

Confucian conceptions of filial piety has been focused on preserving the traditional role of the father as the primary leader and decision maker of the family. In the hierarchy of traditional Chinese cultural family life, the father and sons take prominence over the mother and daughters. A cliché of classical texts, which is repeated throughout the tradition, is the familiar notion that men govern the outer world, while women govern the home.

Mencius outlined the three subordinations. A woman was to be subordinate to her father in youth, her husband in maturity, and her son in old age. Familial relationships are prefixed, and family lifestyles and behaviors are constrained by social norms.

In the Han dynasty, the female historian Ban Zhao wrote the Lessons for Women, advice on how women should behave. She outlines the four virtues women must abide by: proper virtue, proper speech, proper countenance, proper merit. The "three subordinations and the four virtues" is a common four-character phrase throughout the imperial period.

As for the historical development of Chinese patriarchy, women's status was highest in the Tang dynasty, when women played sports (polo) and were generally freer in fashion and conduct. Between the Tang and Song dynasties, a fad for little feet arose, and from the Song dynasty onwards foot binding became more and more common for the elite. In the Ming dynasty, a tradition of virtuous widowhood developed. Widows, even if widowed at a young age, would be expected not to remarry. Their virtuous names might be displayed on the arch at the entrance of the village.

=== Influence in contemporary China ===
For Chinese women, discovering personhood and kinship is challenging because Confucian culture can be an obstacle. Confucianism highlights the ideal of "men manage outside; women manage inside" (Chinese: 男主外，女主内; pinyin: nán zhǔ wài, nǚ zhǔ nèi), reflecting female subordination by encouraging women to remain in the household while their husbands are the breadwinners in the outside world. According to Wang's 2012 article, "Goodbye Career, Hello Housekeeping", "80 percent of husbands in China hope their wives will become full-time homemakers" to stabilize their marriage and take care of their families. Under the Confucian influence, it has been the norm for women to quit their outside job to fulfill their obligations as wives while men remain in control outside the household and remain in their profession. It is rare in Chinese society to challenge the idea of women sacrificing their professional career, because Chinese society has a "relative[ly] ambiguous boundary between public and private spheres". This ambiguity may be a vital obstacle to gender equality. A women's sense of self in Chinese society includes her husband, her inner circle and her family by marriage, broadening (and complicating) her definition of personhood. Women's dedication and sacrifices are justified by a societal norms and a Confucian culture which increase female subordination. According to Chinese anthropologist Fei Xiaotong, "Sacrificing the family for one's own interests, or the lineage for the interests of one's household, is in reality a formula, with this formula, it is impossible to prove that someone is acting selfishly". Men are in an advantageous position, since this differential mode of association legitimizes women's sacrifice of their professional career as a normal social pattern for the benefit of the family; a husband's preference for his wife to stay home while he keeps his career is not seen as selfishness. Male selfishness is justified by the differential mode of association which "drives out social consciousness". Wives who sacrifice their "lineage for the sake of [their] family, [they are actually projected as] performing a public duty".

Features of patriarchy in 20th and 21st century China are a combination of contemporary problems found even in the West and traditional Chinese issues.

Men hold most of the major positions of power within the country, especially in the political and military spheres. However, with the decline of traditional practices through the 20th century, women have come to enjoy virtually equal economic power. This is especially true in the cities, where the social stigma of being a working woman is virtually nonexistent, although skepticism of unmarried, career-minded women is increasing. Although both genders face strong pressure to be married, women who remain unmarried past the age of 25 are shamed by state media with the label "leftover women".

In addition, foot binding and arranged marriages have been virtually eradicated.

There is also the issue of forced abortions in China, especially for sex selection purposes; authorities have been accused of giving the women virtually no control over their bodies in this area.

Traditional norms regarding favoring the grandmother on the father's side persisted until after the Chinese Communist Party's victory in the Chinese Civil War. This traditional preference for the paternal grandmother was reflected in the word referring to the paternal grandmother (zumu) and the maternal grandmother (waizumu, meaning "outside grandmother"). The paternal grandmother would be the one who was expected to live with grandchildren and assist in their care and raising. Since the founding of the People's Republic of China, paternal and maternal grandmothers enjoy equal status.

== Family pressure and marriage ==
Women face significant pressures from their families during their mid- to late twenties to quit working and get married. In rural northwestern China, some mothers still consider education less important for their daughters since they are expected to marry and leave home. There is an insignificant gender gap in educational investments in rural northwestern China, however, indicating progress in educational gender equality. Although work can be a way for women to postpone marriage, failure to marry is socially unacceptable for Chinese women. Fewer Chinese women remain working past marriage, and those who do often struggle to balance work and familial expectations. By relinquishing income generation to their husbands and staying home, many Chinese women lose autonomy and authority. Societal adherence to strict Confucian values about filial piety and women's obedience to men, intended to create hierarchies in the home which produce harmony in society, produces a patrilineal, patriarchal system which discourages gender equality. Marriage pressures stem from Confucian values which promote the necessity for women to marry to continue the family lineage by bearing a son.

Family pressure has been, and continues to be, a main driving force of Chinese marriages. Although society has progressed from traditional values, heterosexual marriages remain the most socially-accepted form of union. This leads to struggles for LGBTQ marriages to be accepted, leading to contract or cooperative marriages (hezuo hunyin or xingshi hunyin). Cooperative marriages are an extreme form of heterosexual pretence, typically consensual relationships between a lesbian (lala) and a gay man. Cooperative marriages are the result of strong family pressure to conform to societal expectations of a heterosexual marriage, underpinning the inequality of same-sex marriages.

Further examples of family pressure in Chinese society are flash marriages. A flash (or blitz) marriage is a union between partners who have known each other for less than a month. This form of union has become increasingly popular in China due to economic and social factors. Men and women perceive happiness as a result of stability in contemporary China, particularly in the relationship and family spheres. However, financial stability and successful careers have also become predominant aspirations amongst young professionals. Young professionals (particularly women) are often still expected to marry at a relatively-young age, and if they fail to do so they are known as sheng nu (leftover women). Strong family pressure reinforces this ideology, and the focus on career development often leads to less time for individual personal lives (resulting in flash marriages).

Historically, in China, early marriage was accepted. Child marriage mainly impacted women under the age of 18 up until 1950, when laws were created to prohibit them. Child marriages created room for gender inequality because many of the children who married were women and not men. One main reason for child marriage was to marry the woman off so that their family would no longer need to actively provide for her; instead the woman's husband would take over that role. After laws were created in criminalizing child marriages, the nation funded campaigns to promote marriages after the age of 18, in order also to encourage the limitation of population growth. One of the policies required women and men to marry later in life, the ideal age for women being 25 years old. The age requirement for women to marry was still lower than that of men's, even with the requirement, which contributed to marriage inequality even after child marriages were prohibited. In the modern day, child marriages are actively rising in China, which is affecting women more than men, creating a gender gap in child marriages. This growth happened between the years of 2000–2010, with 2.85 percent rise of women being married before the age of 18.

The revival of patriarchy has not always provided privileges for men. Ordinary men surviving in Chinese society have always faced a crisis of masculinity caused by popular wedding norms. Men are asked to take on the role of financial providers, including the material dimension of buying houses and cars. The different experiences of gender and power relations have led to a constant rise in misogynistic voices.

=== "Surplus women" ===
Women who resist family pressure and do not marry by their late twenties risk being stigmatized as sheng nu (剩女, leftover women). Due to the prevalence of marriage in China, these unmarried women are often seen by potential employers as overly particular or otherwise flawed. The "surplus women" perception promotes gender inequality in the workplace by characterizing unmarried women as inferior. Older women frequently struggle to find jobs, due to discrimination against their marital status.

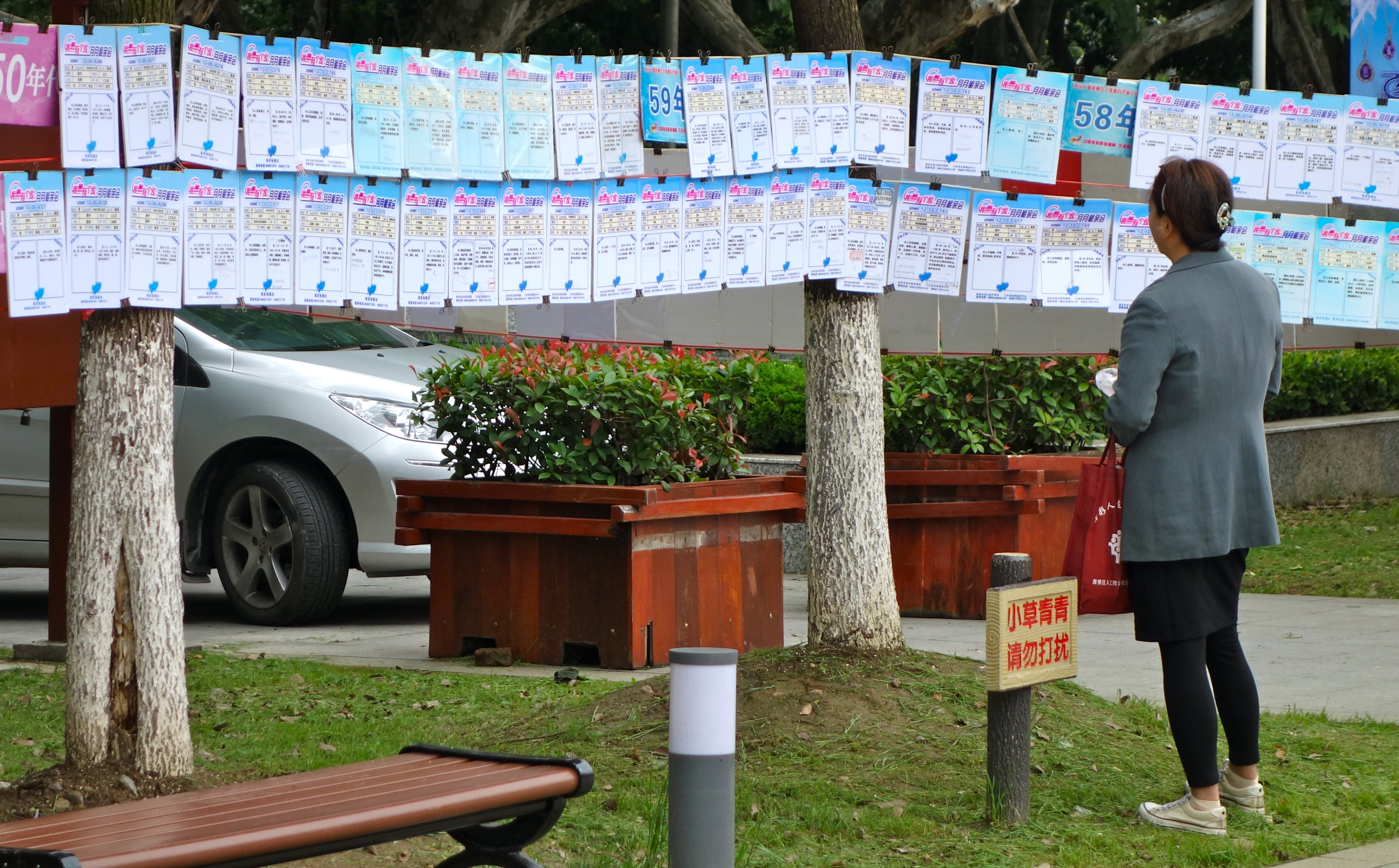
Woman viewing matchmaking ads in China

In response to the surplus-women issue, many urban parents pursue partners for their older unmarried daughters in matchmaking corners. These corners are essentially marriage markets; parents place their daughter or son's name and personal information on a card for others to see as they look for a potential match. Although the success rate for matchmaking corners is low and parents are ashamed of resorting to them, many desperate parents continue to visit the corners on their children's behalf. A frequent complaint from parents of daughters is a lack of quality men nationwide, despite a surplus of men. Matchmaking corners illustrate the importance of marriage and the lengths to which parents will go to ensure that their daughters do not become "surplus women". Due to parental anxiety, women are pressured to marry young (even a flash marriage, at the cost of career and independence) before they see themselves as too old to find a quality husband.

== Gendered social mobility ==
=== Hukou system ===
Originally developed during the Communist era to inhibit mobility between the countryside and the cities (increasing government control), the Hukou system (household registration system) remains influential. Under this system, families are registered in a specific region and can only use schools and healthcare in that region. Since hukou is tied to the maternal line, the system disproportionately affects social mobility for women. Although rural women can travel to cities for work, these migrants have no access to healthcare (due to their rural registration) and limited ability to marry and bear children in the city. When migrant women have children in the cities, their children have no access to education unless they return home or they pay out of pocket. Many migrant women are forced to return to the countryside to have children, sacrificing their urban jobs and temporarily separated from their husbands.

Families with urban registration have significant advantages over those with rural registration. School-age children from urban families with parental incomes, education, and jobs similar to rural families generally receive two additional years of schooling at higher-accredited and better-funded schools. Since hukou is passed through the maternal line, the system prevents rural women from giving their children social mobility and perpetuates gender and rural-urban inequality.

=== Family role and job mobility ===
Studies of gender differences in contemporary China indicate that family concerns affect men's and women's job mobility differently labeled the “motherhood penalty”. Women tend to exit employment early because of demands created by marriage and family. Household tasks that are routine such as cleaning and cooking take up significant amounts of time, but are not given the same value as flexible home maintenance tasks which are traditionally taken on by men. Thus, men are given tasks that can be shaped around their work schedule, while women take on routine labor that is more likely to interfere with their career. The strong urban-rural divide of China's economy places restrictions on job mobility, with increasing mobility skewed towards men. A study of unemployment duration among urban Chinese women indicated that married women have a higher layoff rate, longer unemployment periods and less opportunity to be re-employed than married men.

The Chinese social welfare system is lacking which places the burden of caring for aging parents and young children. This domestic labor along with state policy and employment contracts caps a woman's career despite earning more than their husbands. Women are expected to retire five years before men in the same career field, thus they are less likely to receive promotions because their expected useful life is 15 years less than a man with the same education and experience. An urban study of job changes noted employer discrimination against, and fewer career opportunities for, married women (who, it is believed, have lower productivity and commitment to work due to family obligations). Some workplace contracts place restrictions on marriage and pregnancy throughout the duration of employment. However, in comparison to Western economies, young women in China maintain a high employment rate, which is protected by the PRC Law on Protecting Women's Rights and Interests (1992). The financial dependence for married women in China on their husbands creates a social phenomenon where women are happier if their husbands are better off socially and economically. Women who earn more than their husbands are less happy because Chinese society perceives men as the breadwinner and women as the manager of the domestic sphere. Many women seek a work-family balance by choosing family-friendly jobs ("female-typical" jobs, with lower pay and less opportunity for career advancement) to fulfill their expected responsibilities from work and family.

=== Access to assets ===
The traditional Chinese family is patriarchal. This view regulates gender roles and divisions of labor in the family, and affects resource allocation in the family and any family business. Men usually control valuable resources and assets such as land, property, and credit, and can accumulate capital and start a business more easily than women. In a family business, women are usually unpaid labor and entrepreneurial rights and opportunities are reserved for men.

Women are expected to be family caregivers. In contemporary China, women are also expected to financially contribute to the family (especially in rural China, where economic development is relatively low). In many rural families, men and women will migrate to urban areas to support their rural family. A study of migrant workers in southern China found that women usually spend less and send a larger proportion of their wages back to their rural family than men do.

=== Housing ===
In relation to gender inequality in marriage, housing has also promoted inequality in regards to owning, buying, and division of duties. Recently, housing prices in China are rapidly rising, leading to housing inequality and gender gaps for homeownership. In marriages in China, more traditional values are being reported amongst younger generations, which is a reason why men instead of women own the houses. The traditional values include the belief that men are responsible for providing for the family and owning property, especially in marital agreements. These traditional values affect women by having them negotiate their own power, and leads to inequality in the housing market and marriage. On the other hand, homeownership is also affecting the rates of marriage. Rising house prices are making it harder for couples in China to get married earlier, due to the belief that it is required to have a home set up in order for marriage to take place. This belief causes puts more pressure on the men in China to acquire a house and have it ready for a wife.

Along with gender inequality in home ownership and marriage, there is also gender inequalities in regards to time allocation of duties around the house. Due to urbanization and changes within the workforce, allocation of duties at home have shifted. Also, there has been a shift in ideals in which women prefer equal rights and opportunities, while men prefer more traditional values. In recent years, more women have been joining the workforce, leading to men having more duties at home. Even though men are having to fulfill more duties at home, this is not always equal across all of China. Instead, a lot of women are having to fulfill duties at work and go home to fill more household duties, meanwhile men do not, leading to an allocation of unequal time in regards to gender.

=== Extracurricular self-development ===
Institutions and activities for self-improvement have emerged in China, particularly in urban centers. These training activities may foster skills relevant to the job market or focus on self-realization. Many women in China participate in such activities, particularly those related to emotional well-being and psychotherapy. However, access to these activities is limited by gender. Women often consider their self-improvement as limited to their lives before marriage, since after marriage (unlike men) their main role is caring for children or parents.

Patriarchy in China refers to the history and prevalence of male dominance in Chinese society and culture, although patriarchy is not exclusive to Chinese culture and exists all over the world.

Patriarchy in China is a historically male-dominated cultural phenomenon. From Confucianism to modern times, patriarchy is deeply rooted in Chinese society. Traditionally, men dominated the family and society, while women were expected to be subservient to their fathers, husbands, and sons. However, over time, Chinese society has undergone tremendous changes, including the elevation of women's status and the gradual dilution of traditional customs. In contemporary China, although men still dominate the political and military spheres, women have begun to gain almost equal economic power. However, some traditional attitudes and practices, such as forced abortions and social pressure on "leftover women" (women who remain unmarried past the age of 25), remain a challenge.

== Media ==
=== Framing of women's issues ===
Much of mainstream media has featured marriage and private life as women's issues, rather than gender discrimination and inequality. A study indicated that "delaying marriage and relationship" was the most-frequently-discussed topic in mainstream media. It has focused on women's personal lives, such as marriage and romantic relationships, while gender issues such as "gender discrimination" and "traditional expectations" have often been ignored.

In 2015, the Feminist Five were arrested for planning on passing out sexual harassment stickers in public. In 2022, the Communist Youth League of China (CYLC) posted an article on Weibo, criticizing what they called "Extreme Feminism" and quickly gained widespread attention. Within 3 days, the post gained 602k reposts, 269k comments, and 6.3m likes. The CYLC claimed that extreme feminists have been causing confusion and division about gender opposition online, urging the public to eradicate them to restore a clean online environment.

=== Nüzhubo ===
Nüzhubo (female broadcasters) are female performers who stream themselves performing on live-streaming sites, mostly by singing, dancing, video-game commenting, or eating (mukbang). "Livestream viewing has become a mainstream pastime with more than 200 active livestreaming platforms and millions of concurrent viewers every day in contemporary China." The live-streaming industry in China is dominated by women, and the growth of the industry is built on the popularity of Nüzhubo. Nüzhubo earn a living by receiving virtual gifts from followers, and are subject to "constructions of the male gaze" by media and the public. With fierce competition for viewers and followers, most try to attract viewers (especially male viewers) with their appearance. Some are criticized by local and foreign media for their use of sexual content to increase popularity.

== See also ==
- Marriage in modern China
- Chinese patriarchy
- Women in China
- Globalization and women in China
- List of Chinese administrative divisions by sex ratio
- Female infanticide in China
- Abortion in China
- Missing women of China
- Chinese marriage
