= Women's health in China =

Women's health in China refers to the health of women in People's Republic of China (PRC), which is different from men's health in China in many ways. Health, in general, is defined in the World Health Organization (WHO) constitution as "a state of complete physical, mental, and social well being and not merely the absence of disease or infirmity". The circumstance of Chinese women's health is highly contingent upon China's historical contexts and economic development during the past seven decades. A historical perspective on women's health in China entails examining the healthcare policies and its outcomes for women in the pre-reform period (1949-1978) and the post-reform period since 1978.

In general, women's health in China has seen significant improvements since the foundation of People's Republic of China in 1949, witnessed by improvements in multiple indexes such as Infant Mortality Rate(IMR), Physical Quality of Life Index (PQLI), etc. However, due to traditional Chinese ideology on gender inequality and complexities of Chinese political system, challenges in terms of many aspects of women's health, such as reproductive health and HIV/AIDS, are still mounting.

== History of Women's Health in China ==
=== Late Qing dynasty ===
In the late 19th century, Chinese reformers began call for the modernization of childbirth based on Western scientific medicine. These debates intensified when May Fourth Movement reformers began criticizing the role of the traditional midwife for what they described as its backwardness and feudal superstition.

=== Nationalist China ===
In the 1920s, the Nationalist government drafted a national program of maternal and infant health care which built off the ideas of the May Fourth reformers and other concepts of medical modernization which were developing around the world.

China lacked medical infrastructure and modern-style medical personnel, and the Nationalist program therefore focused on professionalizing midwifery with different regulations for rural and urban areas.

=== Pre-reform PRC (1949-1978) ===
After the 1949 founding of the People's Republic of China, the country established its first public healthcare system, the Cooperative Medical Scheme (CMS), which focused on the needs of the country's huge rural population. The CMS was a three-tier system: barefoot doctors, township health centers, and country hospitals. In the end of the 1970s, over 90% of rural villages had set up cooperative medical schemes (CMS). The implementation of CMS has seen significant improvement in population health in China, including female health. Studies by Mei-yu Yu et al. found that the female Infant Mortality Rate (IMR) declined from 170 per 1000 in 1953 to 136 in 1957, and female average life expectancy at birth rose from 44.8 in 1949 to 67.1 in 1975. Contrary to the Chinese census, Banister's studies have shown that female IMR is higher than male IMR in China at least since 1975. Mei Yu-yu et al. believed that such a discrepancy in IMR between female and male could be a result of preference for sons in traditional Chinese ideology, which may cause abandonment, unequal treatment or violence against female infants.

In the PRC's early years, traditional midwives came to be viewed as dirty and unscientific. The government sought to expand hospital infrastructure and to replace traditional midwifery with modern techniques approved by the newly-established socialist health authorities. In urban areas, women increasingly gave birth at hospitals. In rural areas, women continued to give birth with the aid of local midwives, including those certified by the government who had taken a short-term course on new birthing methods. By 1959, over 750,000 midwives were retrained with some modern medical practice, but only 5,300 were fully modern trained midwives. With China's program of barefoot doctors, perinatal practitioners were often older women. Their work was effective, with much of the 1950s and 1960s population boom resulting from the decline in infant mortality.

By the late 1970s, most rural areas had a developed but low-tech childbirth infrastructure, with local teams of certified lay midwives worker with barefoot doctors. Rates of hospital births increased significantly in China as a whole, with most home births occurring in rural areas.

=== Economic reform (1979–present) ===
During Reform and Opening Up, China implemented far-reaching reforms: decollectivization and land tenure reforms, promotion of township and village enterprises (TVEs), state sector reforms, and policies to encourage foreign direct investment (FDI) and trade liberalization. These policies were implemented as China moved to a market economy and were furthered in order to insure their membership to the World Trade Organization (WTO). These policies are hailed by many as being highly successful, producing massive economic growth while raising the standard of living by reducing poverty. China has taken a gradual and highly regulated approach to its transformation, and while China started its transformation earlier than other socialist countries. it is still undergoing that transformation. These measures have led to much growth, and as China continues to increase its GDP, those same policies have led to decentralization and privatization of healthcare.

In the 1980s, the necessity of rural home births continued to be reflected in health care regulations.

Beginning in the 1990s, the China received significant foreign aid to improve its hospital and medication equipment, in part due to major international public health campaigns like the United Nations Safe Motherhood Initiative and the Millennium Development Goals Program. China also allowed public hospitals to finance technological upgrades through fees charged to patients.

Hospitals births were made compulsory.

==== Health and dormitory life ====
As the market opened new employment, opportunities for women became available. Those new opportunities were primarily in the service and textile industries. The number of Chinese women working as of 2007 was 330 million which is now 46.7% of the total working population, the majority of these women are working in the agricultural or industrial sectors with a high concentration working in the garment industry. These industries lend themselves to dormitory living. These dormitories are filled with migrant workers, none of whom can stay in the urban areas without being employed. Young women have become the most prevalent demographic for migrant work, making up over 70% of those employed in the garment, toy, and electronic industries. These women now called dagongmei are typically short term laborers who are contracted for a short period of time and at the end of their contracts they either find more work or are forced to return home. That type of labor contract leaves these dagongmei with very little bargaining power as they seem to be easily replaceable.

The dormitory life in China leaves women with little to no home space independence from the factory. All of the women's time spent traveling from home to work is eliminated and working days are extended to suit production needs. Sick days and personal health are of little concern in these dormitory settings. Women will often neglect their own health out of fear of retribution from factory supervisors. Furthermore, as shown in the documentary "China Blue" if a woman becomes pregnant while working she will be either fired or forced to quit shortly after her baby is born because she will not be able to meet her work responsibilities. In 2009 alone, over 20,000 Chinese dorm workers became ill while living in these dorms, the majority being young women. While living in dormitories, women migrant workers' time is not their own. As they become assimilated into the factory life they are almost completely controlled by the paternalistic systems of these factory owners and managers. Hygiene and communicable diseases become a threat to health as women live in rooms of 8-20 people sharing washrooms between rooms and floors of the dormitories. The only private space allotted is behind the curtain that covers an individual's bunk. Male and female workers are separated and there are strict controls placed on the sexual activity of both. These conditions pose a great threat to not only the physical but also the mental health of these women workers being away from their home and placed in a highly restrictive environment. While those changes did allow China to achieve unprecedented economic growth, the privatization of many industries also forced China to reform its healthcare policies.

==== Wage discrimination reduces access to healthcare ====
Another factor that limits women's capabilities to access healthcare is their relative low wage compared to men. China promotes itself as having almost no gender bias when it comes to wages yet we see that compared to men women are making less money. The Chinese government touts their "equal pay for equal work" mantra, however, women find that their work in the textile industries is not equal to the work done in industries requiring "heavy" labor so in the end women make less than men because they are perceived as not being able to do the "heavy" work. This inequitable pay leaves women more vulnerable and with less capability to pay for their individual healthcare when compared to men. While 49.6% of women are uninsured demonstrating that there is not much disparity between uninsured men and women. The lack of insurance does not affect men and women equally as women needs tend to be greater in order to provide care for child birth, family care, and security. Social security coverage has also been a factor as only 37.9% of those receiving social security are women; again this becomes an issue as elderly women are unable to pay for their growing health costs. As the cost of healthcare increases due to deregulation of trade and privatization, research has shown that the conditions mentioned above have greatly reduced women's capability to access healthcare in China.

=== WTO membership (2001-present) ===
While China's entry to WTO was presumed to further motivate its economic development and improve its market structure, it has also been worried that joining WTO will worsen China's labor surplus because over-hired labor in state enterprises may be deemed "inefficient" once China entered global market. Moreover, studies have shown that the workforce in China was made of only 40% women but 60% of those laid off were women, which demonstrated that women are much more vulnerable to these effects than man.

Statistics obtained in 2008 have shown that males enjoy higher physical well-being than females. However, it is not addressed if the situation could be related to China's changing economy in any ways.

By the 2010s, the practice of home birth had ended through the practice of subsidizing rural hospital deliveries and banning rural midwives from practicing.

== Healthcare policies ==
Health systems in China have changed considerably during the transition to a market economy. As the transformation evolved, China's new decentralized government divided responsibility for urban health services between the ministries of Health and Labor and Social Security. As the industrial markets were liberalizing so too were the health systems, which left many Chinese citizens uninsured having to pay for their care out of pocket with cash. Under China's new trade policies brought on by membership to the WTO, China's open market was exposed to foreign competition. This led to the import of better drugs and more expensive medical equipment, which in turn gave way to higher cost of care. This priced out many Chinese who were in dire need of medical attention.

Between the late 1970s and the late 1990s, the Chinese government transfers for health expenditure fell by 50% and are continuing to fall. The Chinese were spending more on healthcare but the share the state was spending went down from 36.4% of the total health expenditures in 1980 to 15.3 percent in 2003; conversely, individuals' contributions increased from 23.2% to 60.2% during the same time period. As stated above, women make less on average than men in China thus leaving women particularly vulnerable to the rising costs of healthcare. One elderly women interviewed by Liu stated that she knew many older women who when confronted with the prospect of an expensive medical procedure opted to commit suicide rather than burden their families with the cost.

In addition to bearing gender disadvantage, rural women suffer even more from insufficient healthcare due to increasing spatial disparity in China. Based on studies by Xiaobo Zhang et al., healthcare facilities have been significantly scarcer in rural areas. In 1980, hospital beds and healthcare personnel per 1000 people in cities were 4.57 and 7.82, respectively, compared to 1.48 and 1.81 in rural areas. Such disparity has grown over years. Moreover, infant mortality rate in rural areas has been significantly higher than in cities, with the gap reaching 2.1 in 2000. The ratio of female to male IMR increased dramatically from 0.9 to 1.3 over the same period. More seriously, female IMR in rural areas rose from 34.9 to 36.7 in the period of 1990–2000, as families in rural areas often have a stronger boy preference.

== Women's health outcomes ==
=== Reproductive health ===
==== Prenatal health ====
One of the aspects of women's health to suffer the most as the economy shifts to a free market system is reproductive health. As health firm privatize those firms are less likely to provide free preventative health, and as a result they have discontinued the practice of providing regular reproductive health examinations. Due to this from 1997 to 2007 only 38 or 39 percent of women are getting the reproductive examinations that they need. There is also a widening gap between urban and rural women with regards to their respective health indicators. Health indicators show that in 2003 96.4% of urban women vs. 85.6% of rural women visited a doctor during their pregnancy. In urban areas children under 5 had a mortality rate of 14 per 1,000 again vs. 39 per 1,000 so children born in rural China were twice as likely to die before the age of 5. There are also more traditional gender values that reduce women's access to healthcare. In one study it was shown that the majority of women still are reluctant to seek out medical help for issues concerning their gynecological needs. The unwillingness to get regular vaginal and breast examinations has led to severe vaginal infections and late detection of breast cancer. Women resist getting these vaginal exams because if they are found to have an infection their identity as a woman is called into question as her role of care giver is reversed and is labeled as a care receiver. When infections were found it was reported that women often didn't even think they were suffering from an illness, and it is speculated that they perceived these infections as part of the female condition. These attitudes are common and spread due to poor healthcare systems and health information.

Abortion in China is legal and generally accessible. Abortions are available to all women through China's family planning programme, public hospitals, private hospitals, and clinics nationwide. In August 2022, the National Health Commission announced that it would direct measures toward "preventing unintended pregnancy and reducing abortions that are not medically necessary." Those measures include encouraging reproductive education and improving support measures in the areas of taxation, insurance, education, with encouragement for local governments to boost infant care services and family friendly workplaces.

The National Health Commission also announced that assisted reproductive technology will be gradually included in the national medical system. IVF is expensive in China and has not been accessible to unmarried women.

==== Labor and delivery ====
The rate of cesarean sections began to sharply increase in China in the 1990s. This increase was driven by the expansion of China's modern hospital infrastructure, and occurred first in urban areas. The rise in cesarean deliveries has also resulted in social critique of the medical establishment over the medical necessity of performing cesarean sections.

==== Postnatal health ====
The tradition of "doing the month" or "sitting the month" (Chinese: 坐月子; pinyin: Zuò yuèzi) has significant influence on women's postnatal health in China. Denoted as "postpartum confinement" in western scholarship, it is a series of everyday practices from special diet to restrictive activities meant to help postnatal women to recover from the trauma of birth. It is believed that such practices can help women restore their "harmonious equilibrium" in body and therefore prevent certain diseases later in their lives. Especially in Hong Kong, mother and baby sometimes "sit the month" in special clinics.

Researchers debate whether the tradition is helpful or dysfunctional. Shu-Shya Heh et al. have found that "doing the month" makes women less likely to develop postnatal depression, because they perceive high social support from their family. Other studies have also shown that certain elements of the custom jeopardize postnatal women's health, such as lack of exposure to sunshine or imbalance of nutrition.

=== HIV/AIDS ===
HIV in China has been on the rise as well rising from 15.3% in 1998 to 32.3% in 2004. This sharp rise is due to the lack of recognition and education, as for years in HIV was considered a western disease that would not affect the Chinese population and because of this rhetoric China found itself ill-equipped to deal with the social and health issues relating to HIV. There was some attempt at safe sex education and access to condoms for sex workers in the 90s but these were largely token gestures and had no real effect. At one point the Chinese government in some provinces went as far as to outlaw AIDS victims from marrying, or serving as teachers and doctors. This uninformed perception of AIDS victims was particularly damaging to women and homosexuals as they were perceived as the carriers of this disease.

A recent sign that catches increasing attention is the rise in new infections among women compared to men. Recent estimates by the Chinese Ministry of Health and the Joint United Nations Programme on HIV/AIDS shows that the ratio of reported infections went from 5 men to 1 woman during 1995–1997 to 4 men to 1 woman by 2001. During 1999–2008, the proportion of women infected with HIV doubled compared to the previous decade. During 1999–2008, the proportion of women infected with HIV doubled compared to the previous decade. Analysis by Population Reference Bureau attributes such rise primarily to three aspects: physical vulnerabilities of women, soaring sexually transmitted infection (STI) rates in China, and women's social vulnerability in China. Durin99-2008, the proportion of women infected with HIV doubled compared to the previous decade. Specifically, unprotected sex exposes women to a risk of HIV infection of 2-4 times higher than for men due to the biological structure of women's vagina. Also, STI rates, as a marker of infection rate of HIV/AIDS, are also on the rise in China for the past few decades, and young women in migration or commercial sex industry are particularly vulnerable to STI.

=== Eating disorders ===
Studies have shown a high level of body dissatisfaction among young women across China. Like other parts of the world, reported eating disorder symptoms are also significantly higher for females than males. Among various predictors, perceptions of social pressure and teasing play a significant role in impacting young women's weight-related concerns. Sing Lee et al. have found that women's concern with body fat is more severe in developed areas such as Hong Kong. Some interpret prevalent eating disorders among women as a side effect of the societal modernization in China.

=== Suicide ===
China accounts for 30% of the world's suicide and it is the only country where women have a higher suicidal rate than men. According to Pin Qing's study, approximately 56% of women who committed suicide worldwide were Chinese. Some explanations state that prevailing gender discrimination in China is a main cause of high female suicide. Many traditional concepts of Chinese society, such as an emphasis on women's domestic and reproductive role, all put women at a vulnerable position. In August 2017, the 26-year-old pregnant woman, surnamed Ma, jumped from a hospital window, after she was not allowed to receive C-section by her husband's family. The family declined Ma's request to receive C-section because they believe the procedure would make it harder for her to give birth to a second child. The incident has stirred hot debate about women's status within households and ongoing propaganda on two-child policy.

In recent years, however, female suicidal rate in China has decreased significantly, from 26.1 per 100,000 to 15.7 per 100,000 in 2000. The female to male suicide rate decreased from 1.2 to 0.96 in urban areas. Paul S. F. Yip attributes such progress to rapid modernization during the 1990-2000 decade, which involves great improvement in the standard of living, education, etc.

It is also important to note that the rural suicidal rate is three-fold the urban rate in China, and the decrease in female suicide rate is much less significant in rural areas. Liu Meng's field studies in rural China indicated that women sometimes use suicide as a means of rebellion in their private space, a way to achieve the influence and power that were unattainable in their lifetime. Such is related to the more extreme forms of patriarchal oppression in rural areas.

=== Intimate Partner Violence ===
According to studies by William Parish et al. in 2004, 19% of female respondents in China reported experience of intimate partner violence while 3% of their male counterparts reported such. The study showed that duration of the relationship and low socioeconomic status both have a positive correlation with the occurrence of male-on-female violence, and respondents from inland or Northern China are also more frequently found to experience such violence.

Experience of intimate partner violence was found to exert serious adverse impact on women's physical and mental health. Multi-country studies by Henrica A F M indicated that 19-55% women who experienced intimate partner violence were actually injured by their partner and they are exposed to significantly higher risk of mental illness such as emotional distress.

== See also ==
- Health in China
- Health in India
- Women's health
- One child policy
