= Globalization and women in China =

Overview of the impact of globalization on women in China

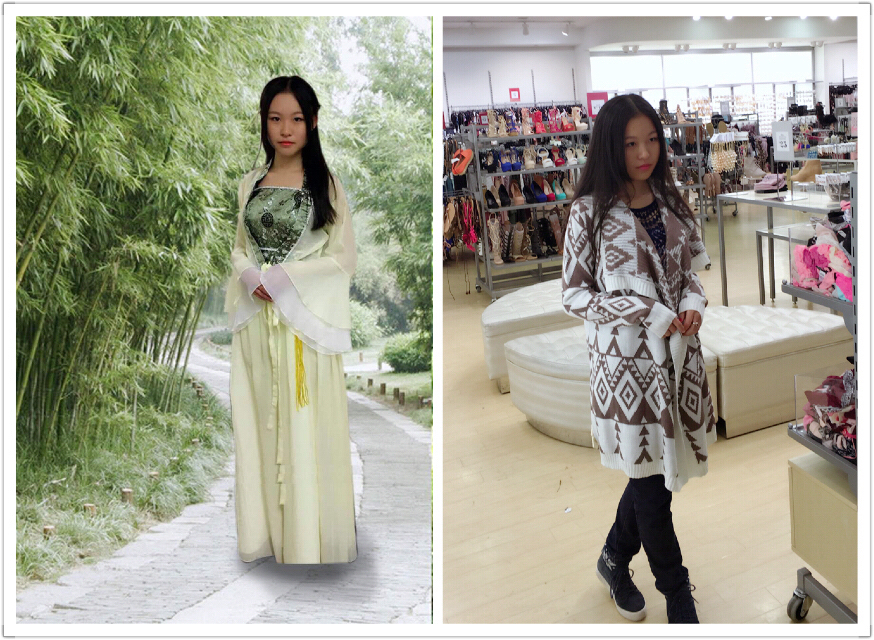
A Chinese woman wearing traditional clothes and one shopping for modern clothes. The contrast shows that globalization has changed fashion and culture for Chinese women.

The study of the impact of globalization on women in China examines the role and status of Chinese women relative to the political and cultural changes that have taken place in the 20th century as a consequence of globalization. Globalization refers to the interaction and integration of people, products, cultures and governments between various nations around the globe; this is fostered by trade, investment, and information technology. Globalization affected women's rights and the gender hierarchy in China, in aspects of domestic life such as marriage and primogeniture, as well as in the workplace. These changes altered the quality of life and the availability of opportunities to women at different junctures throughout the modern globalization process.

The dynamics of gender inequity are related with the ideological principles held by the ruling political regime. The imperial era was dominated by the social paradigm of Confucianism, which was a pervasive philosophy throughout the Orient. Confucian ideals emphasized morality, character, social relationship, and the status quo. Confucius preached ren (humanity) and the equality and educability of all people; Neo-Confucianists and Imperial leaders used his beliefs in social hierarchy, particularly in the family setting, for the physical and social oppression of women. As the Chinese government began to re-assimilate themselves into the global community in the late 19th to early 20th century, it shifted away from conventional Confucian ideals and women's role in society changed as well. After Mao Zedong established the People's Republic of China in 1949, a change in traditional gender roles came about. Mao's death marked the beginning of the current communist administration, and an influx of international communications in the areas of commerce, politics and social ideals. Since the 1980s, under the new communist party, the women's rights movement has gained momentum and has become a national issue as well as a sign of modernization. Some reporters state that increased globalization and the Belt and Road Initiative have led to an increase in sex trafficking of women in China.

In rural areas, women traditionally work alongside their family to produce crops like tea and rice. In urban areas, women work in factories, living away from home. Most of these factory workers are young girls who send their income to their families. To help maintain the rights of women in factories, labor unions and organizations were built. In their homes, women take care of their children and cook.

== Western bias ==
Western scholarship has historically used ideas of subordinance and victimization to characterize traditional Chinese womanhood. These beliefs were largely constructed on the basis of ideological and political agendas, and were widely accepted despite their ethnocentrism. Early European writings pertaining to Chinese women were produced by missionaries and ethnologists at the conclusion of the 19th century. The goal of the missionaries was to "civilize China", and highlighting weakness and victimization provided for the continuance of their work. This belief prompted scholars to use female subordination as a means to validate Western ideas about Chinese culture and Confucian principles.

In the 1970s, as the feminist movements were forming, they began to affect the literature surrounding women in China. Studies on Chinese women from this period were concerned with women's liberation, and were sympathetic to the feminist movement. This sentiment largely influenced the topics and methodology of the research. With this shift in perspective, the focus of discourse remained on subordination, patriarchal oppression, and victimization. These studies examined such issues as foot binding and the chastity of widows. Literature formulated by feminist writers did nothing to dispel the myth of the weak, subservient woman. These works provided a new bias that had not before been articulated. Feminists believed that Chinese women were a part of a "universally subordinated womanhood". This line of thinking illustrates the cultural superiority inherently felt by Western women. Writings on Chinese woman rarely account for differences in time, ethnicity, class, region or age, preferring to describe the status of women as a static, unitary fixture of Chinese culture, despite the political and geographic boundaries that defined different regions and the economic and social changes that occurred throughout history.

== History of female oppression in marriage ==
=== Traditional roles and Confucianism ===
From the Han dynasty (206 BC-220 CE) until the modern period (1840–1919), scholars and rulers developed a male-dominated patriarchal society in China. Patriarchy is a social and philosophical system where men are considered as superior to women, and thus men should have more power in decision-making than women. Confucianism was at the root of the development of the patriarchal society in China, and emphasized the distinctions between the sexes and the roles they have within the family. These ideologies continued through the Tang dynasty (618–907), and girls were taught from a very young age to be submissive to their fathers, then to their husbands, and later to their sons. During the Song dynasty (960–1297), Confucian scholars further developed the patriarchal tradition with more restrictions for women, including foot binding for girls at a very young age.

=== Married life in Imperial China ===
The traditional Chinese marriage system benefitted men more than women. This effect could be seen in monogamy, concubinage, divorce, and the heritage of lineage and property through the male line. After the Spring and Autumn period, elite men could take primary and secondary wives, concubines, and maids. Ancient Chinese women were denied the right to choose their marriages. Generally, traditional Chinese marriage was organized by the parents of the groom and bride in order to obtain alliances between the two families to ensure the continuance of the family line. The prime mission of a married woman, regardless of her social status, was to bear at least one son in order to carry on the family name. Therefore, women were only valued for their reproduction functions. Three types of marriage dominated in Ancient China. The first traditional Chinese marriage type, which originated in the primitive society, was called a "capture marriage", in which the groom would go to his prospective bride's house at dusk to "kidnap" her. The second type was called a "purchase marriage", in which women were paid for by their husbands. Once women were purchased, they became their husband's possession and could be traded or sold. The third type was the "arranged marriage", which could be traced back to the Warring States, emphasized the necessity of parental control and matchmaking institutions. Matchmakers acted as go-betweens for both families. If there was not a matchmaker, the marriage could be deemed unacceptable and could be dissolved. Once two people were married, the wife would leave her family, live with the husband's family, and be obedient to her in-laws as if they were her own parents.

During the Zhou dynasty, the upper class considered daughters-in-law as commodities of the husband's parents, not the husbands. This meant that wives had to be subservient to parents-in-law. They were expected to have impeccable manners, including refraining from coughing and sneezing in the presence of their husbands' parents. Wives could not leave their rooms or accept gifts from relatives without permission. Refusal to turn gifts over to parents-in-law lead to physical abuse and expulsion from the family. In addition, wives were required to serve in-laws, including helping them bathe, arranging their bedding, and cooking. People placed a strong emphasis on food preparation in Ancient China. Cooking was one of the most time-consuming tasks for wives because of traditional rituals and high expectations for the taste and appeal of food.

=== May Fourth Movement ===
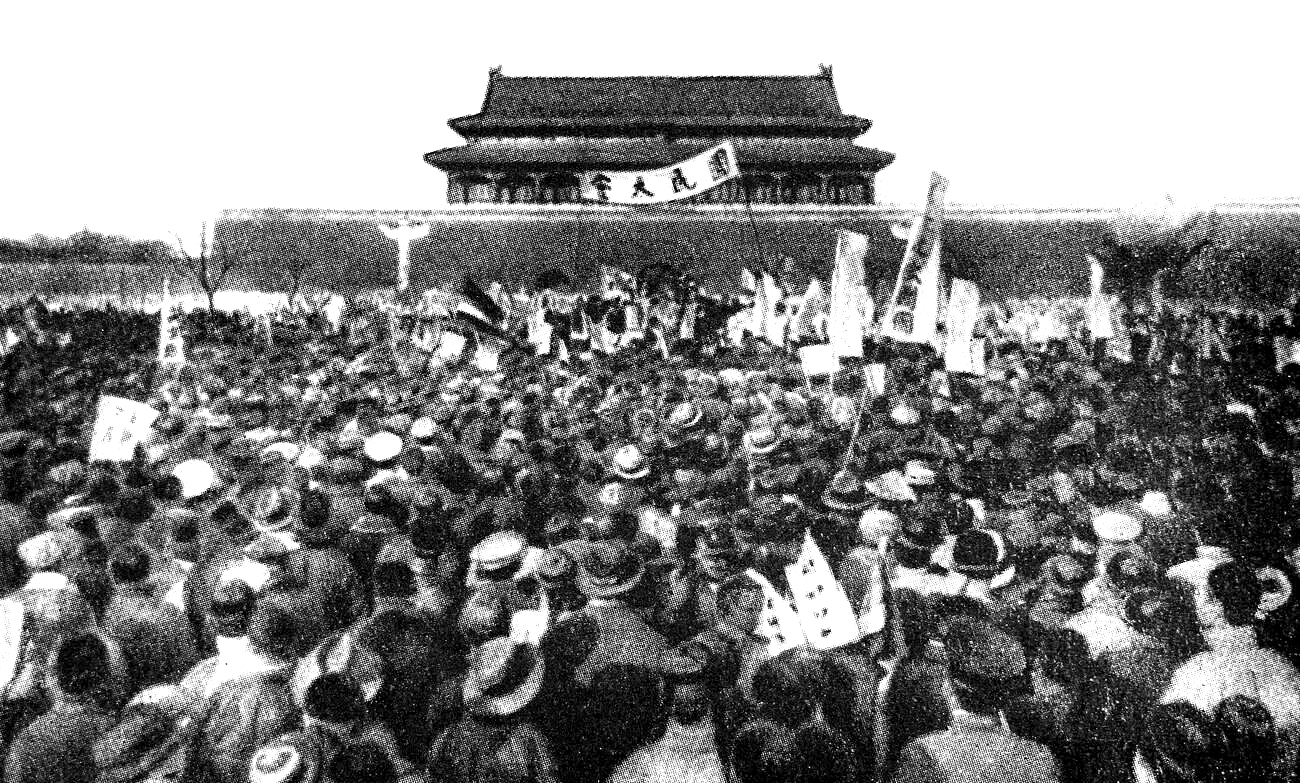
Protesters at the May Fourth Movement

The "New Culture" movement began in China around 1916 following the unsuccessful activities of the 1911 Revolution to establish a republican government, and continued through the 1920s. The May Fourth Movement, which took place on May 4, 1919, was a demonstration led by students at the National Peking University against the government, in which they protested the abolition of Confucianism and changes in the traditional value system. Many believed that the solution to China's problems would be to adopt Western notions of equality and democracy. Since the movement stressed group efforts and propaganda, women were involved in numerous collective tasks such as publication, drama production, and fund raising, which helped them gain more social contact with men and win respect.

=== Marriage reforms in the twentieth century ===
Chinese modern heterosexual monogamous marriage was officially established with the Marriage Law of 1950 after the founding of the People's Republic of China. The New Marriage Law declared the abolition of the feudal marriage system, which included arranged and forced marriage, male superiority, and the disregard for the interests of children. This law also asserted the rights to divorce and embraced the free-choice marriage. Although progress has been made, Chinese women are restricted by the heteronormative and hypergamous marriage system. Currently, all Chinese women are still expected to marry a man with superior educational and economic status in their early or mid-twenties. Many well-educated and well-paid urban professional women tend to delay their partner seeking and marriage, which results in a supposed revival of tradition – parental matchmaking. Since Chinese parents generally do not "use a daughter's marriage to build a family network or maintain a household's social status" anymore, this matchmaking is not a forced marriage; it is a suggestion intended to benefit their daughters.

As a result of these reforms, the roles of wives have changed for both rural and urban women. Today, a wife's role is to support her husband and children, not serve her in-laws. Mothers-in-law have less authority, and married couples are able to have more intimate relationships. Since the one-child policy was established, urban wives have devoted their time to raising "'the perfect only child,'" so they now exert more effort creating their own families than serving in-laws. Despite this focus on children, patrilocal residence increased again towards the end of the twentieth century. Urban parents have stayed close to their sons to help them find jobs, housing, and services. Rural women have also gained more autonomy, including the freedom to voice their opinions and desires. Wives in the wealthy countryside have demanded construction of mansions for neolocal residences.

== Domestic life of a Chinese woman ==
=== Foot binding ===
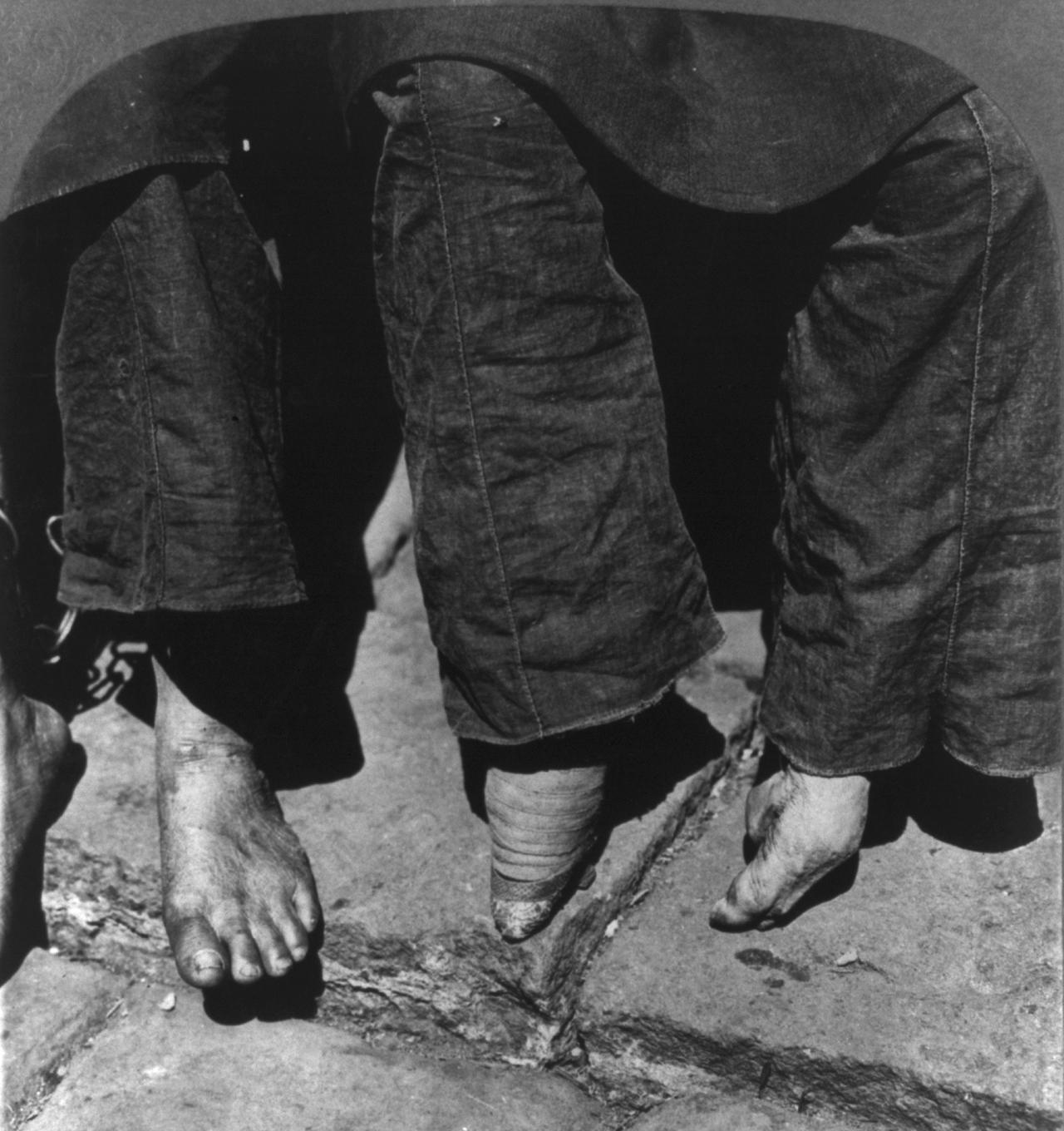
A comparison between a woman with normal feet (left image) and a woman with bound feet

Foot binding is the process in which the arch of a woman's feet is broken and the toes are wrapped up against the foot to create a smaller looking foot with an acute arch. These "fists of flesh" were seen as attractive and arousing for men and the practice was passed down as a prerequisite to marriage from mother to daughter across generations. The process of foot binding was painful and often confined women to their rooms. Few lower-class women were able to have their feet bound because they needed to be able to walk normally to accomplish house work. Bound feet came to be an indication of high class and wealth for women. Chinese male reformers during the imperialism period recognized the liberation of the Chinese women as something necessary for their own sake. The humiliation that China had gone through on an international level was turned on the Chinese "women". Naturally, the foot binding was recognized as "national shame", and people found it as a serious problem to be disappeared, thus raging anti-footbinding campaigns in the 1890s to the 1900s. Moreover, the new government that came in after the 1911 revolution banned foot binding practice. Thus, it started to disappear in the coastal areas in 1900 to 1920. However, the practice was still popular within the interior areas of China till the 1930s and even in the 1950s.

=== Changes to customs based on Confucianism ===
Under Confucianism the typical family was patriarchal because men had the capability to pass on the family name and carry on the lineage of the ancestors; women were expected to be subservient. Adoption of Western family values in the twentieth century challenged traditional Chinese values. Nationalism contributed to the changes of customs and status of women. Nationalist revolutionary Qiu Jin promoted feminism through various essays and speeches, as well as through her Chinese Women's Journal. Jin chastised wife beating, female infanticide, arranged marriages, and foot binding. She eventually began teaching at a girls' school. Around this time, many other schools for girls opened in China. This led to increased job opportunities for women in the 1920s.

Later, as the Communist regime changed the structure of Chinese society through economic reform, the structure of the Chinese family was altered. "The Four Olds" (sijiu) – old ideas, old habits, old customs, old cultures – were discouraged and were replaced by Communist ideology, particularly during the Cultural Revolution. The economy was shifted to total government control with few chances to own private property and communal property. Collectivization destroyed "clan-based" systems and had a great effect on motivation of workers and family loyalties.

The traditional social structure was further degraded by the Cultural Revolution. The Red Guards turned members of a family against one another as they sought out "class enemies" to be sent for "re-education", ultimately resulting in a loss of family ties. Women were elevated to equal status as men through a series of laws which prohibited practices such as arranged marriages, concubinages, dowries, and child betrothals. Under these marriage laws, women enjoyed joint property in marriage and could file for a divorce.

As a result of Communist rule in China, the social status of women improved greatly. Women were empowered to work outside the home. Communist rule also brought about the end of practices such as foot binding, child marriages, prostitution, and arranged marriages. China has seen a decrease in domestic violence due to government-supported grassroots programs to counter these practices. Women in rural areas remain largely uneducated.

=== Population control ===
During the reform period, the Communist regime in China regulated birth control. The government shaped policies with the intention to develop population science "through selective absorption of Western science and technology." In 1979, the Planned Birth Policy was implemented. The Chinese government only allowed one child per Han family, with more children allowed to non-Han families. Since this planned birth policy was implemented based on local laws rather than on a national population law, the level of birth restriction differed in urban and rural areas. In families reliant on farming for income, the household is the fundamental unit of production, so many rural families would rather pay the hefty fines for excess birth.

In 2011, city couples who both came from one-child families were allowed to have a second child, while couples in rural areas could have a second if just one of them came from a one-child family. In 2013, the further revision of the Planned Birth Policy allowed couples in which either parent had no siblings to have two children. In 2015, China allowed all couples to have two children, abolishing its decades-long one-child policy for urban families.

Another instance of population control is the prevalence of female infanticide. People in rural areas practiced female infanticide and selective neglect due to a preference of sons over daughters. Since the 1980s, roughly 200,000 female infants would be killed per year because of the preference for male children and the advancement in technologies such as ultrasound, which help to find out the sex of the fetus. In addition to female infanticide, girls are being unregistered or are abandoned by their families, which stops them from receiving education and legal benefits the government offered. These methods of controlling population have resulted in a huge gender gap in China.

== Chinese women throughout the workplace ==
=== History of working women ===
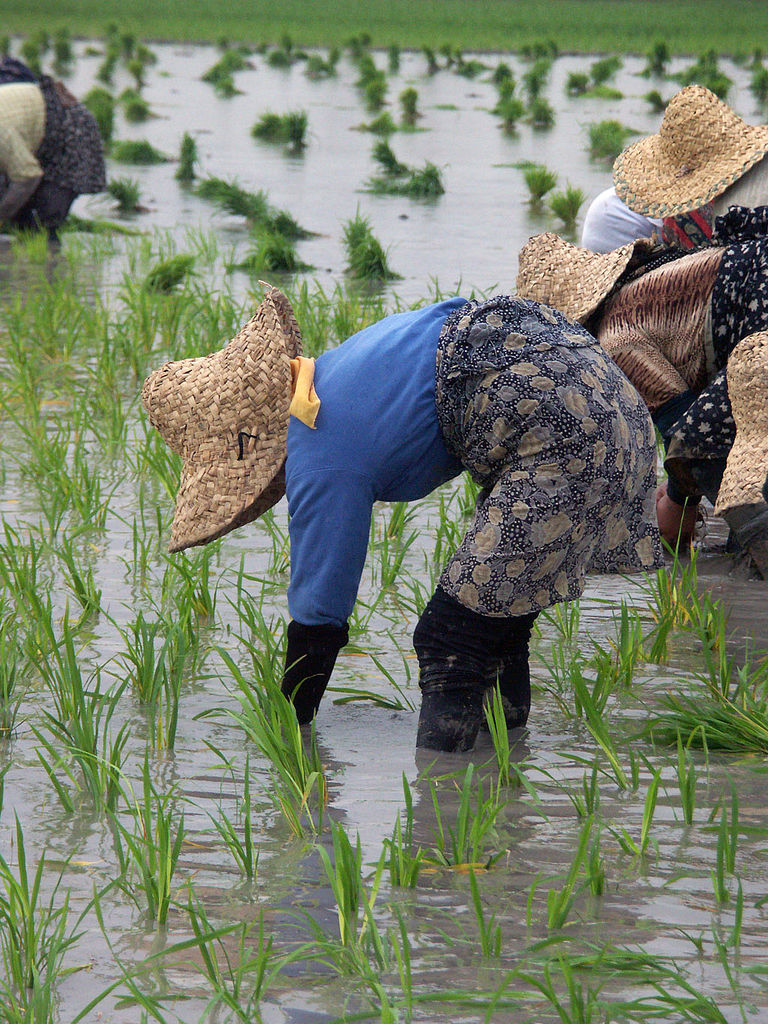
Women working in rice fields

In the imperial era, women experienced physical restrictions that limited their social positions. They held jobs that required minimal physical activity like domestic chores and producing textiles to sell or use.

During Mao's rule (1949–1976), Chinese women were needed for their manual labor for farming and for urban industrialization. To compensate for their hard work, they were provided access to education and politics. The Chinese government supported women's education. The percentage of girls attending school was 96.2% compared to below 20% before the People's Republic (1949). The Chinese government has tried to decrease the number of women illiterates while promoting adult and vocational schools. The percentage number of illiterates has gone down from 90% in 1949 and 32% from 1993. In the first 30 years of Communist rule women's discrimination was decreasing, but they did not have jobs that had real decision-making power.

The Chinese government has made great efforts to achieve a high level of economic status for women. Since 1949, with the founding of the People' Republic, the rate for employed women has risen. Chinese women account for 44% of the work force and 34.5% account for the women's work force in the world.

=== Rural areas ===
The key role women have in farming is to maintain ownership of the main sources of production in rural areas. In traditional China, women were not allowed to own land or property. Land was inherited through the sons, and if there was no son in the family, it was taken by a close male relative. In less populated areas, women do more agricultural work than men because of shifting cultivation. In more populated areas, men do more work than women because extensive plough cultivation is used. Female involvement is high in the double-cropping rice area. Other types of work women perform in the countryside include pig and poultry rearing, spinning, weaving, basket-making, and other handicrafts. This type of work supplements agricultural income.

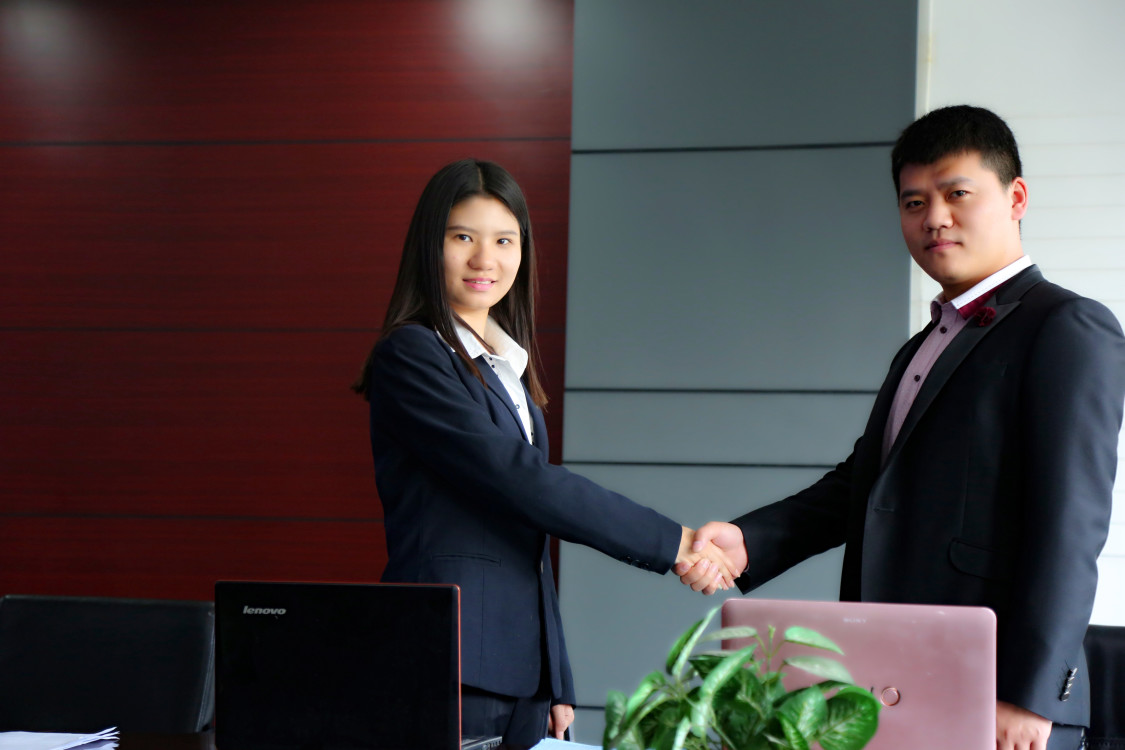
A professional woman is making a deal with her male client. This shows globalization has increased job opportunities for women in urban China.

=== Urban areas ===
China's economic policies laid the basis of the industrialization drive in export-oriented development, and its reliance on low-wage manufacturing to produce consumer goods for the world market. Young migrant women left their homes in rural settings to work in urban industrial areas. Work included export-oriented industrialization, manufacturing in electronics and toy assembly, sewing in garment production, and mixed assembly and sewing in the footwear industry. Hong Kong and Shenzhen were cities established as centers of export-oriented industrialization, and migrant women workers have made up 70% of Shenzhen's three million people.

Private sector employers are reluctant to hire women because Chinese law requires that the employer cover maternity leave and childbirth costs. However, certain industries prefer female workers for assumed benefits. For example, the beauty economy, which is defined as "a marketplace in which young, attractive women are used to promote commercial products and services", includes the sales industry. The development of the sales industry has increased job opportunities for women, but women are also restricted to these gendered professions.

==== Reasons for migrant labor ====
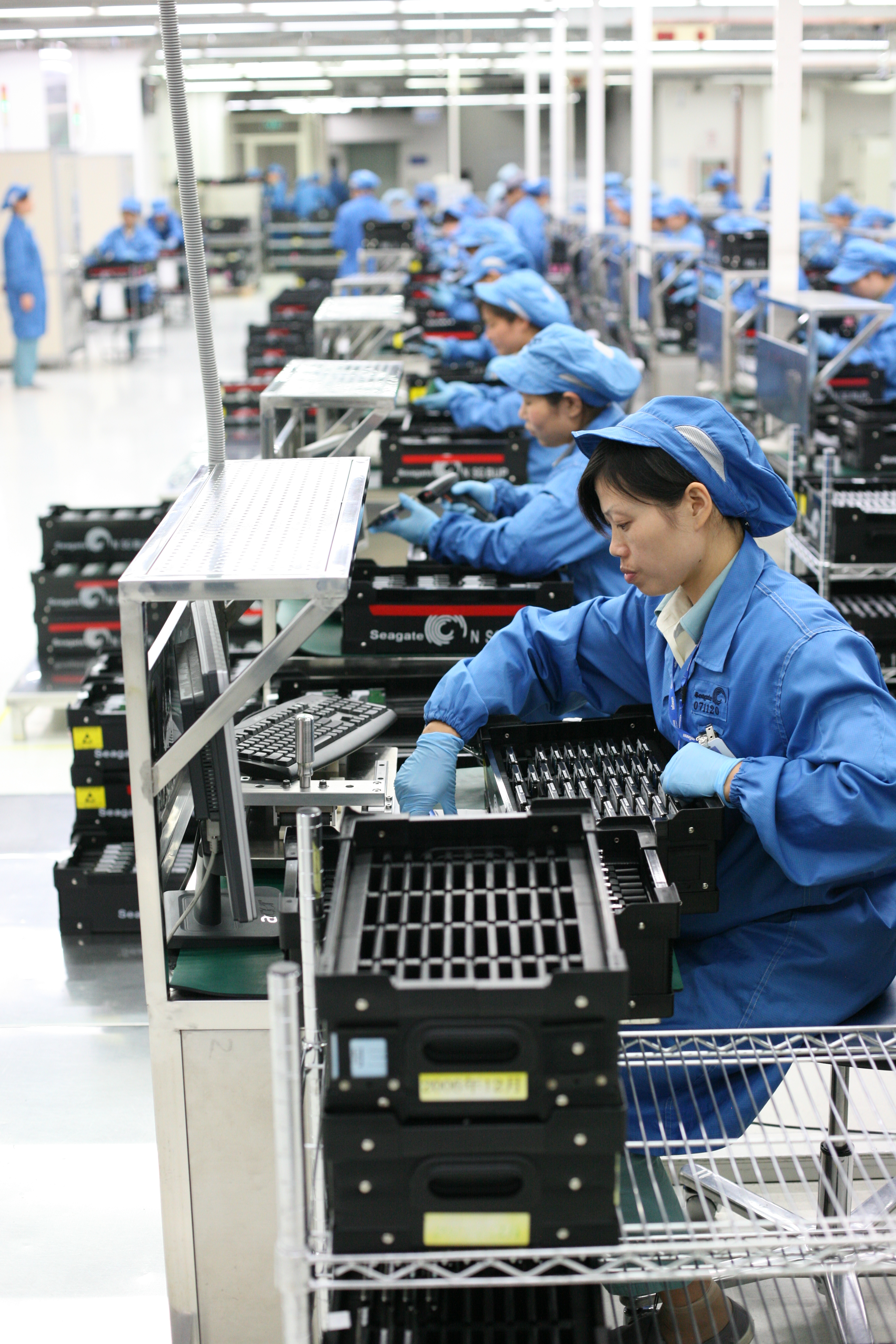
Workers perform final testing and QA before sending drives off to customers on its 2.5-inch notebook lines.

A recent phenomenon, the migration of rural Chinese workers began in 1984 when the Regulations of Permanent Residence Registration became less punitive and allowed people to move to find employment. People left rural areas to escape poverty, and women left due to the lack of local opportunities for them. In the cities, women could find new, low-paid factory-based jobs that did not require highly skilled workers. According to national statistics, the ratio of male to female migrant workers averages 2:1, and an estimated 30-40 million of the migrant women work in the cities, namely Hong Kong and Shenzhen.

In the Nanshan district of Shenzhen, women comprised 80% of the workforce and had an average age of 23. Young female workers are preferred over older women or men for several reasons. First, as married women are less mobile, female migrant workers are younger and more likely to be single than their male counterparts. Young rural women are preferred for these jobs primarily because they are less likely to get pregnant, and are able and willing to withstand longer working hours, have "nimble fingers, and will be less experienced in asking for their statutory rights. In many cases, migrant women sign contracts stating that they will not get pregnant within their period of employment."

In the interest of the family, rural women are sent to find urban employment over male counterparts, mainly to supplement familial income at home and to support the men, who are more likely to attend college. The male standard of education in China is higher, particularly when a family is under financial stress, women are more likely to drop out of school to generate income for the family. Because women have lesser impact on the family's long-term financial stability, their rights for opportunities development are consequently unequal. This inequality also reinforces emotional motivations for migration. Many women migrate to find personal fulfillment. Stereotypes in China that developed as a result of globalization portray rural women as "backward" and urban women as "modern". Many people associate modernity with maturity, so rural women migrate to cities to be perceived as mature. Migrant women also appreciate the knowledge they obtain (including political- and self-awareness) while living in cities. Some women even report desiring to leave villages as a result of boredom with rural life. Ideas perpetuated due to globalization simultaneously increased women's intentions to become independent; many migrant workers desire lives separate from those of their families'.

This new system allowed rural residents to migrate, it did not allow them to change their residence or accept any benefits in the cities. This resulted in a growing population of migrant laborers without the minimal benefits of residency including medical care, housing, or education. Many migrant women do not trust the government to protect their rights. Today, up to 90% of migrants work without contracts, in violation of the Chinese labour law.

==== Degradation ====
The freedom to display femininity and gender equality seem incompatible in Chinese society. Gender equality appeared prevailing only when women were restricted to desexualization in the Mao era. Reform and opening up guarantees women's freedom for resexualization, but it simultaneously brings back gender inequality.

Women factory workers are known as "dagongmei" (working girls). They are traditionally young female migrants who experience a segmented labor market in informal and low-wage employment sectors. Workers in export-oriented factories receive minimum wage and minimum overtime pay, they pay for meals and lodging at the factory, and they pay fines for breaking factory rules. The average daily wage, for a 12-hour day in a toy factory, in the mid-1990s was US$1.10 for migrant women workers in Shenzhen. Although migrant workers in China still earn low wages, their average income has increased over the past several years. In 2008, the average daily income for migrant workers in China was equivalent to US$6.48. In 2014, the average daily income was equivalent to US$13.86.

These conditions create "maximum surplus appropriation"; workers' daily lives revolve around factory production and are dependent on the economic conditions. The state disallows local unionization and has the All-China Federation of Trade Unions (ACFTU) as the legitimate forum of worker representation. Without the right to form unions and with the state sanctioned ACFTU, migrant women workers find it hard to effectively gain suitable rights and treatment from the factory management. The 2003 statistics from the People's University show 90% of migrants work without contracts, directly violating the Chinese Labour Law. According to the ACFTU, migrant workers are owed over 100 billion Yuan in back wages.

Organizations are now attempting to assist and empower female migrant workers through training and education on their labor-related rights. Legal clinics have begun to assist female migrants in filing claims against employers and local labor bureaus. One case of female worker exploitation in the Hua Yi garment factory in Beijing resulted in mistreatment by management as well as withholding pay for at least 24 women. After filing complaints, in collaboration with the Center for Women's Law Studies and Legal Services of Beijing University, the women received 170,000 Yuan in back wages and compensation.

Relations between workers and employers represent both the immediate need of manufacturing plants for large quantities of low wage laborers, and the insecurities young workers face in relocating long distances to life in factory dormitories. Hiring single young women serve needs of management. The employment of young women allows management to exhibit maximum control and authority over the labor force. Compared to older women and male workers, young single women are susceptible to the authority and demands of management. The common manipulation of "factory as family" by owners and managers suggests how workers hold a subliminal status within the factory environment. Uneven power relations inside the factory result in demands from management for personal services from women workers, from hair washing to sex.

== See also ==
- Women in China
- Sexuality in China
- Chinese economic reforms
- Qiu Jin
- Family planning policy
