= Sex-ratio imbalance in China =

Demographic phenomenon in China

For years, the census data in China has recorded a significant imbalance in the sex ratio toward the male population, meaning there are fewer women than men. This phenomenon is sometimes referred to as the missing women or missing girls of China. In 2021, China's official census report showed a sex ratio of 112 male to 100 female births, compared to a global average of 105 or 106 male to 100 female births. This is down from a high of 118 male to 100 female births from 2002 to 2008. The sex imbalance in some areas was even higher. The 2000 Chinese census recorded 138 boys to 100 girls in Jiangxi, making it the province with the highest gender ratio of births in the country.

Some early research into the sex ratio imbalance pointed to sex-selective abortion practices in the wake of China's one-child policy. However, a number of studies have concluded that China's sex ratio was in fact closer to the norm, with population statistics skewed by age because of the number of rural people who did not register their baby girls (i.e., so that they could avoid China's family planning policies). These studies observed that the sex ratio began to even out around 7 years old, when children were registered for school. Similarly, in December 2016, researchers at the University of Kansas reported that the missing women might be largely a result of administrative under-reporting and that delayed registration of females, instead of sex-selective abortion practices, which could account for as many as 10 to 15 million of the missing women since 1982. Researchers found unreported females appear on government censuses decades later due to delayed registration, as families tried to avoid penalties when girls were born, which implies that the sex disparity was likely exaggerated significantly in previous analyses.

== Background ==
Amartya Sen noticed that in China, rapid economic development went together with worsening female mortality and higher sex ratios. Although China has been traditionally discriminatory against women, a significant decline in China's female population happened after 1979, the year following implementation of the reform and opening up under Deng Xiaoping. Sen concluded that there were three reasons why the environment for Chinese women had deteriorated, particularly since 1979:

The one-child policy was implemented in 1979 in an effort to control the size of families, which meant having a "one-child family" for most Chinese families, with some exceptions. Because of a strong son preference, these compulsory measures resulted in a neglect of girls and in some cases led to female infanticide. China did not appear to be systematizing sex-selective fertilization or pre-conception practices; it was therefore assumed that 10% of female children go missing at some point after conception: whether in utero, or in early infancy. Female infant mortality increased dramatically in the years immediately following the reforms in 1979; some statistics imply that female infant mortality doubled from 1978 to 1984.

A general crisis in health services arose after the economic reforms, as funding for China's extensive rural health care programs had previously largely come from agricultural production brigades and collectives. When the economic reforms abolished these traditional structures, they were replaced by the household-responsibility system, which meant that agriculture remained concentrated within the family and the availability of communal facilities in China's extensive rural health care system was restricted. Generally, the effect of a restriction in medical services was neutral, but in a Chinese rural society that looked up to men and down on women, the reduction in health care services significantly negatively affected women and female children.

The household-responsibility system involved a reduction of women's involvement in paid agricultural labor. At the same time, employment opportunities outside agriculture were generally scarce for women. According to Sen's cooperative conflicts analysis, "who is doing productive work and who is contributing how much to the family's prosperity can be very influential", the effect of this systematic change on women within the household was negative, because women had fewer bargaining powers in their families. This reality motivated families to prefer boys over girls, which contributed to reduced care for female children.

== Causes ==
The causes of the high sex ratio in China result from a combination of strong son preference, the one-child policy, easy access to sex-selective abortion, food scarcity, and discrimination against and abuses of females.

=== Son preference in Chinese historical and traditional culture ===
China's traditional Confucian patriarchal culture has a strong preference for sons over daughters. This preference stems from several perceptions: sons are seen as the continuation of the family line, the offering of ancestor worship, and the main heir to the inheritance. In contrast, daughters are often seen as financial burdens. After marriage, daughters usually become part of the husband's family and are no longer responsible for the care of elderly or sick parents.

With socio-economic development, modernization, and the advancement of women, son preference has declined in many urban areas of China. However, in some strictly traditional families and rural areas, son preference still exists and has resurfaced under the one-child policy. The greatest shortfalls of females appear in parts of rural China, where there are instances of 140 male births for every 100 females.

=== 20th-century family planning measures ===
From 1949 to 1979, Mao Zedong went back and forth between seeing large populations as a source of strength and recognizing the dangers of overpopulation. Although Mao had considered economists' suggestions in the mid-1950s about the possible establishment of a nationwide family planning organization, he later returned to advocating rapid population growth during the Great Leap Forward.

By the 1960s, when population growth rates surged after a nationwide famine, family planning commissions were instated throughout the country. Population control campaigns did not cover ground, however, until after 1971, when a number of voluntary measures, such as later marriage ages, fixed intervals of years between births, and a limit of two children, were advocated by the central government. After Mao's death, Deng Xiaoping rose to power in 1978. Under his leadership, contraceptive measures became priority policies in the context of family planning. Deng believed population control to be essential to economic growth and went to extreme lengths surrounding reproductive control to achieve that goal. Amidst an urgent political culture of economic, and developmental ambition, the government implemented the one-child policy in 1979.

=== One-child policy ===
Throughout the 1970s, China experienced a significant population boom. In an effort to enhance environmental and economic conditions by limiting population growth, China implemented its one-child policy in 1979. The policy enacted a number of rules dictating the governmentally sanctioned composition of a Chinese family: each household was permitted one birth, and risked consequences ranging from fines to forced sterilization if they violated regulations. The policy was strictly enforced in urban areas where residential densities were usually higher, and its effects differed depending on the region: it was not heavily enforced among the country's ethnic minorities, and a number of exceptions were made among the majority Han population. The Chinese Communist Party were told to use "patient and painstaking persuasion" as this would help the people ease up to the family planning ideas. Allowances were also made for families in which the first and only child had a disability.

Xuefeng Chen, director of the Chinese Children's Center in Beijing, stated, "it is undeniable that single children will create a different society, we must first enhance single children's opportunities and abilities at social communication, interaction and development." Single children in China are deprived of the experiences undergone by their mothers and fathers. Their well-being is considered to be at risk; they may exhibit the stereotypical behavior of single children, or be characterized as spoiled, selfish, and unsociable. The one-child policy has been called the "most momentous and far reaching in its implication for China's population and economic development." The reproductive freedoms of the Chinese population were utilized as a political tool for social modernization.

The one-child policy highlighted a traditional preference for sons; its results included heightened rates of sex-selective abortion, female child abandonment, and, in some cases, female infanticide. The policy also resulted in an increased underreporting of female births and adoptions. Chinese health authorities have characterized the gender imbalance among newborns as the "most severe and enduring" in the world, a direct consequence of the country's stringent one-child policy. All of these factors contributed to the stark "missing women" phenomenon, whose social consequences can be observed in an overabundance of single men, and an increase in the kidnapping and trafficking of women for marriage and sex work.

The one-child policy was ended and replaced by a two-child policy in 2016 and then by a three-child policy in 2021.

=== Food scarcities ===
One of the main factors that led to the creation of the One Child Policy was China's insurmountable food scarcity. Following 1956, the state or local governments claimed ownership of all rural lands through mandatory forfeitures and below-market-value compensations. As a result, farmers were limited in their ability to raise capital since they could not sell, rent, or buy land to make more economically viable tracts or use the land as collateral for loans. The government's control over land also decreased individual incentives to work hard, as the farmers could not make a profit from the crops they produced, consequently leading to large-scale starvation and an increase in wealth inequality.

Food shortage issues were further worsened by the successive droughts in the Yellow River Basin, Southwest and Southern China, the North China Plain, and the Yangtze River from 1958 to 1960. These resulted in deplorable agricultural conditions for almost every region in China and triggered the Great Chinese Famine of 1959–1961.

== Sources ==
As a result of the one-child policy and traditional son preference, China's missing female population is formed through sex-selective abortion, discrimination in care for females, and non-registration of girls at birth.

=== Sex-selective abortion ===
Son preference, the one-child policy, and prenatal sex-identifying technology have aided the spread of prenatal discrimination in parts of China where abortion is legal. Due to the fact that too many female fetuses are aborted, China's law prohibits testing the gender of the fetus. However, many families would send the blood samples of pregnant women to Hong Kong for gender testing, as the law in Hong Kong does not prohibit such practices. Sex-selective abortive procedures result in excess of male births, which then significantly skew sex ratios within a population. According to China Statistics Press 2013, China's sex ratio at birth was 111 in 1990, 117 in 2001, 121 in 2005 and 119 in 2010. Approximately 37–45% of China's missing women may have gone missing prior to birth. Researchers found that sex-selective abortions can create long-term social problems within populations. A dearth of women may be detrimental to gender equality: reduced populations of women wield reduced civic power. In regions where marriage is essential to social advancement, a shortage of brides and mothers may lead to increased kidnappings, forced marriages, and violence.

Some argue that sex-selective abortion has benefits. Access to prenatal sex determination increases the desired birth of sons, thereby reducing post-birth discrimination against and abandonment of girls. India, South Korea and China have all reported lower female mortality in the last decade. It has also been argued that the scarcity of women leads to a greater valuing of the women who are born; their social status is heightened as a result. Sex-selective abortion also empowers mothers to choose the sex of their child; due to son preference, a woman may gain familial recognition through her ability to produce a son.

=== Female infanticide at birth ===
Female infanticide is the murder of baby girls due to a preference for male babies. Though newborn girls exercise a biological advantage over newborn boys in surviving their first year of life, premature mortality incurred by infanticide, as well as malnutrition and healthcare neglect lead to a female infant mortality rate that outpaces that of males in China. Scholars found that, in some rural parts of China, "as many as half of all newborns were sometimes killed by their families".

As Amartya Sen points out, practices of female infanticide have occurred throughout Chinese history. The Great Chinese Famine during 1959–1961 led many families to choose female infanticide as a means of conserving food and resources. More recently, China's one-child policy played a major role in heightened rates of female infanticide. In September 1997, the World Health Organization's Regional Committee for the Western Pacific claimed that "more than 50 million women were estimated to be 'missing' in China because of the institutionalized killing and neglect of girls due to Beijing's population control program that limits parents to one child".

China's population control policy revealed strong, pre-existing cultural son preference, which broadened the disparity between comparative rates of male and female infanticide. Traditionally, daughters grow up to "marry out" and leave their families, whereas men remain financially useful for the rest of their lives. Girls are seen as burdens with little payoff, especially among many of China's neighboring countries. The Quan Han Shu mentions that no festivities were held when a daughter was born into a prosperous family, and that poor people did not even rear their female children.

In a Chinese natural survey in 2003, thirty-seven percent of young women, predominately urban, said they had no gender preference and forty-five percent reported their ideal family would consist of one boy and one girl. The elimination of female infants has contributed to the phenomenon known as, "missing women". Female infanticide, sex abortions, drowning, and withholding of health care and nutrition are possible consequences of the restrictive one-child policy.

==== Abandonment of infant girls ====
Under the one-child policy, some Chinese parents in rural areas abandoned their very young daughters in order to increase the possibility of raising a son. More than 95% of babies in state-owned orphanages are healthy baby girls, while a high percentage of these abandoned girls die within a couple of months because of the poor conditions and health neglect in orphanages. Those parents who abandoned their daughters leave their children either not far from their homes or close to public places to ensure the babies can be found by others. According to an official in Liaoning province, "Every year, no fewer than 20 abandoned baby girls are found in dustbins and corners."

=== Poor health care and malnutrition ===
The neglect of proper health care and nutrition for girls and women contributes to missing women. Discrimination against daughters post-birth leads to poor health care and malnutrition, and, in many cases, premature death. For adult women, early-life conditions directly influence their health and mortality later in life. According to Chinese traditions, the period of zuò yuèzi (坐月子), or the first 30 or 40 postnatal days, is an essential convalescence for mothers to ensure their future health. If they are not given support or taken care of within this period of time (e.g., some rural women do heavy farm work within zuò yuèzi), potential risks include health complications and early death.

=== Contraceptive use ===
In an attempt to control the country's population in 2015, the Chinese government expanded opportunities for contraceptive use. Kaining Zhang, a researcher physician at the Yunnan Health and Development Research Association, said: "20 years ago if you went to the rural villages, you could see the slogans on the wall that read, 'If you have one child, IUD please, if you have two children, sterilization please' ... There is still a very strong influence [from that] policy." Attitudes towards reproductive health have dramatically changed throughout the country. Sexual health was often something kept private and not openly discussed. A survey conducted by Renmin University in 2015 states that more than half of the respondents think premarital sex is acceptable. The traditional views on sexual health, and contraception are rapidly changing, affecting the young and unmarried generation primarily.

China has one of the highest rates of contraceptive use in the world, even in comparison to other Asian countries. Among 84.6% of women who are currently married or in union are using a form of contraception. The United States has a lower rate of 78.6%. Japan, a neighboring country, has reported as low as 54.3% prevalence. The one-child policy enacted in 1979 is the primary contributor of increased contraceptive use. In attempt to really decrease the population, China's family planning policies actually emphasize birth control and many forms are available both in urban and rural areas for free. The strict implications of the one-child policy did allow for many women to receive birth control, but it typically only benefitted those who were married. The young population who were not covered were not married and therefore fell into the gap of unintended pregnancy. The National Population and Family Planning Commission did however oversee China's views by making improvements with the increased access to birth control, and also sex education. Providing women with the access and social support of contraceptive use not only allows for population control but allows families to analyze their option before considering abortion options. The International Family Planning Perspectives states, "the effect of sex preference on childbearing is becoming stronger as fertility declines, because couples must achieve their desired number of sons within a smaller overall number of children". Although contraceptives are not always related to sex preference, "an improvement in the status of women and female children should be helpful in reducing son preference and improvement in maternal and child health and family planning services should be helpful in reducing the number of abortions in the country."

=== Non-registration and underreporting of female babies at birth ===
Some of the missing women in China result from under-reporting and non-registration of baby girls. The family planning policy is disproportionately implemented across China, especially in rural areas. In order to leave themselves opportunities to have sons and avoid paying penalties on over-quota children, some parents in rural areas of China will not register their female babies, leading to a shortfall of girls registered as residents. Although it is the responsibility of the village leaders to enforce the policy, they will underreport the number of births so they will not face penalties from higher authorities.

The study found that the sex ratios of age groups during the one-child policy were similar to those born in the period without the single-child policy. The study also found significant amounts of females appear after the age of ten due to late registration across different age groups. For example, the sex ratio for the population born in 1990 was 111, but the sex ratio for the same population dropped to 103 in 2010 due to 4.8 million late-registered births, with over 900,000 more females than males. The same ratio pattern repeated in other years, with each unregistered cohort having 550,000 to 950,000 more females than males.

The degree of data discrepancy, the accuracy of the census data, and the challenge in relation to the sex-ratio imbalance in China are still disputed among scholars.

== Consequences of the phenomenon ==
=== Wifeless men ===
Since prenatal sex determination became available in the mid-1980s, China has witnessed large cohorts of surplus males who were born at that time and are now of marriageable age. The estimated excess number of males was 2.3, 2.7, and 2.1 million in the years 2011, 2012, and 2013 respectively. Over the next 20 years, a predicted excess of 10–20% of young men will emerge in large parts of China. These marriageable-age husbands-to-be, known as guang gun (光棍), translated as "bare branches" or "bare sticks", live in societies where marriage is considered as part of an individual's social status. Prenatal sex determination along with China's traditional preference for sons over daughters has left millions of men to compete over a limited number of brides, a phenomenon known as the marriage squeeze. On occasion, families would adopt female infants as a way to secure a future bride for their sons. These girls would be raised by their adoptive families to learn how to care for and serve their future families.

Since women tend to marry men in higher socioeconomic groups than their own, the shortage of women in the marriage market will leave the least desirable, the poorest, and uneducated men with no marriage prospects.

Some commentators worry that those left wifeless men may be marginalized as being single is barely socially acceptable in a Chinese cultural context. These wifeless men's lives could be seriously influenced by how the public view them. They may have senses of loneliness, self-failure and uselessness and be prone to psychological problems. There is also a possibility of these young men emigrating out of mainland China to other countries with more women, if the problem continues to persist.

An alternative view suggests that the shortfall of women might have some positive effects on society. Facing declining possibilities of finding wives, men among the surplus cohort are more eager to improve their competitiveness in the marriage market. Some are more willing to take unpleasant or dangerous hard work, thereby providing more labor. They hope that the wealthier they become, the more competitive they will be in finding a wife.

=== Propensity to violence ===
The future social effect of the guang gun remains a topic of concern. The majority of Chinese think that the guang gun are likely to affect criminal behavior. An early commentator predicted that, "such sexual crimes as forced marriages, girls stolen for wives, bigamy, visiting prostitutes, rape, adultery... homosexuality... and weird sexual habits appear to be unavoidable." Annual province-level data for the years 1988–2004 had shown that a 1% increase in the sex ratio is followed by a 3% increase in violent and property crime rates, meaning that unmarried men might account for part of the rise in crime. Conversely, marriage reduces male criminality. A study in China found that people share the same concerns: 65% of 7435 people of reproductive age think crime will increase, 53% are worried about the less safe streets, 60% consider these excess men as a threat to societal stability, and 56% believe the imbalanced sex-ratio will result in an increase in prostitution and trafficking.

Opposing voices argue that no evidence appears to support these worries. After comparing high and low sex ratio areas, crime in areas with more men tended to be no higher than areas with low sex ratios. Also, in comparison with other countries, the crime rates are relatively low in China.

=== Sex trafficking of women ===
China's shortage of women is increasing demand for brides among guang gun (single men). Experts estimate that by 2030, 25 percent of Chinese men in their late 30s will remain unmarried due to the missing women phenomenon. Families in more rural parts of China resort to buying and selling kidnapped brides and forcing them to bear their sons' children. Brides are sometimes kidnapped from across the border in Myanmar. Trafficked women are subjected to sexual, physical, and emotional abuse, forced labor, and, in some cases, forced medications intended to improve fertility. If captors are more interested in having children, women are sometimes released, provided they leave behind the children they have while imprisoned. The majority of abducted women are between the ages of 13 and 24. Law enforcement often ignore missing women reports, and sometimes make families pay to find their daughters and wives. Escaped trafficking victims face immigration law violations under Chinese officials, as well as social stigma when they return to their communities.

==== Prevalence of sex workers ====
One potential problem with a large number of wifeless men is that many millions of Chinese sex workers appear to represent a broad range of backgrounds. Although prostitution is illegal in China, there may appear expansion of female sex workers to meet increased demand of wifeless men. In China, the female sex work industry has flourished in the 20th century.

The number of female sex workers in China increased from 25,000 in 1985 to 420,000 in 1996. It was estimated by the Chinese Public Security Bureau that there were 4–6 million sex workers in China by 2000. The U.S. State Department estimated in 2001 that there were 10 million sex workers in China.

=== Potential risk of HIV ===
In recent years, surplus men have come into the HIV risk sphere. Research suggests that the combined effects of sexual practices, sex work, and surplus males probably have effects on HIV transmission. As a result, young, poor, unmarried surplus men could become a significant new HIV risk group. Before these men find wives, they may be at greater risk of infection with HIV from female sex workers in urban areas.

According to the police surgeon and municipal health officer for Shanghai, the spread of sexually transmitted infection has a close relationship with young unmarried men. For most unmarried migrant workers in China, there is a substantial gap between HIV knowledge and infrequent condom use. Based on a sample of 506 migrants, about half of them had multiple sex partners and 89% of these migrants did not use condoms.

=== Fertility rate ===
In 1965, fourteen years before the one-child policy was implemented, China's fertility rate was 6.39 births per women. After the one-child policy in 1979, the fertility rate dropped to 2.75 births per women and quickly continued to fall in the years to come. Initially, China's goal was to get the fertility rate down to the replacement level of 2.1 births per women, but the fertility rate continued to fall and it is now at 1.09 births per women.

Demographers warn that fertility rates this low can hinder the development of a country and China has started to change their policies in order to increase their fertility rate and avoid any future adversity. In 2015, the Chinese government decided to change the one-child policy and implemented a two-child policy. Some researchers argue that son preference along with the one-child policy are one of the many contributing factors to an imbalanced sex ratio that has left millions of unmarried men unable to marry and start a family.

Scholars and journalists from outside of China argue that simply dropping the one-child policy will help raise the number of girls born into China and thus raise the future fertility rate. Even though the two-child policy is now in act, couples are still choosing to remain a single-child household due to expensive childcare and women's increasing hesitance to leave their careers to raise a family.

=== Aging population ===
Large numbers of missing women also contribute to the problem of population ageing in China. Since females and males together are responsible for the social reproduction, a shortfall of women will lead to a reduction in the number of current and future newborns, ultimately accelerating the aging problem in China. According to forecasts, based on the current sex ratio, the elderly population in China will increase by about 3% annually for the next 30 years. People over 65 in China will account for 15% of the population between 2025 and 2030, while those over 60 will account for a quarter of the population in 2050. This rapidly increasing elderly population will also aggravate the social burden of the pension insurance system.

=== Economic effects ===
The long-term economic outcomes of China's missing women phenomenon are a source of diverse debate. Some scholars argue that, in the short term, declining fertility rates create an advantageous ratio of abundant producers to smaller populations who rely on that productivity (children, infants, pregnant women etc.). However, others argue that over time, as economically productive populations age, the number of dependents decreases and ratios tilt the other way.

== Reactions ==
=== Change in laws and policies ===
To control the imbalanced sex ratio, which is caused by the combined effects of son preference, sex-selective abortion, and one-child policy, the Chinese government has taken some effective measures. Laws forbidding infanticide, abandonment, and neglect of female children already exist. There are also penalties for trafficking and kidnapping. The Chinese government has also published laws forbidding fetal sex determination and sex-selective abortion.

China has recruited unmarried young males from poor backgrounds into the People's Liberation Army and into the paramilitary People's Armed Police.

Improving women's status can also help reduce the sex ratio at birth. The Chinese government pays more attention to women's legal rights, especially their economic development. More emphasis has been placed on forming laws and regulations for women's economic status, education opportunities, inheritance of family property, willingness to marriage, and old-age supports.

From 2005, 600 Chinese yuan per month is given as a pension to parents in rural areas who have daughters. In 2000, in order to establish a better survival environment for girls in Chaohu city, Anhui province, the "Chaohu Experimental Zone Improving Girl-Child Survival Environment" was established and implemented in 2003. The main activities were "establishing specialized organizations, conducting trainings, punishing those found to be committing non-medical sex-selective abortions and infanticide, advocating for regulations and laws addressing gender equality, holding focus-group discussions for mothers-in-law, helping women to participate in socioeconomic activities by providing economic support, encouraging active male participation in the improvement of women's status, enhancing the social-security system, and popularizing uxorilocal marriages (in which husbands marry into wives' birth families), in addition to other activities." The outcomes after three years were encouraging: the sex ratio at birth declined from more than 125 in 1999 to 114 in 2002. Based on this program, in 2003, the Population and Family Planning Commission initiated a campaign called "Care for Girls" to encourage couples to consider the advantages of having girl children. The results were also significant: a survey in 2007 showed that son preference had decreased in participating areas and the sex ratio at birth in the rural of Shanxi province fell from 135 in 2003 to 118 in 2007.

After the discovery of female birth underreporting, the previously thought gender imbalance was likely exaggerated. However, unregistered women cannot enjoy employment opportunities and social security. Scientists urged the Chinese government to register "missing" women and provide support to the unrecognized population.

==== Two-child policy ====
At the beginning of 2017, the Chinese government modified its family planning laws to allow married couples to have a second child. In 2016 the National Health and Family Planning Commission of China reported that live births in national hospitals numbered 18.46 million and the fertility rate reached 1.7 percent, the highest rate since 2000. The effect of the new policy to relax birth-planning regulations has debunked 400 million averted births. Since the policy has been enacted, 261.4 million unregistered people who have lived at their residence for at least 6 months were found. The policy change has taken the pressure off parents to participate in sex-selective abortion or even avoiding registering female babies at birth, as they now have room for two children. Implementing the two-child policy has given families room to grow and control the population in the country, in a managed and more humane way. Although the two-child policy was implemented, the 35-year old social policy is unlikely to take part in a baby boom, in attempt to spark economic growth. The country is believed to be a true single society even when given the option to take part in extending their family count. The two-child policy is not expected to serve as a baby boom, but rather a moderate increase in fertility among Chinese women. There are still effects resulting from the one-child policy which the two-child policy is intended to attempt to reverse, including population aging, reduction in sex ratio birth, more oppressive elements of child policy, contributions to economic growth, and allowing freedom to couples to have their desired number of children. The Chinese government has implemented a policy to encourage women to have more children by providing cash subsidies to families.

In mid-2025, the government began offering a subsidy of 3,600 yuan (GB£375; US$500) per child each year for all children born, until the child reaches the age of 3. The subsidy is retroactive for children born since January 1, 2025.

==== Policy responses ====
The Canadian Medical Association recommends solving the imbalance by outlawing sex selection. Many laws already forbid fetal sex determination throughout countries in Asia.

Many campaigns, such as the "Care for Girls" campaign on China by the National Population and Family Planning Commission, encourage female births and request participation from neighboring countries. In one of the participating counties in Shanxi providence, the sex ratio at birth was reduced from 135 in the year 2003 to 117 just three years later.

=== Change in attitudes ===
Although China's sex ratio at birth is still one of the highest in the world, growing evidence has shown that son preference in China is declining. In recent interviews, many young Chinese adults expressed the view that they do not care about the gender of their future child, even though son preference was common in their parents' generation. A recent study showed that among the 34% who do not claim to be gender indifferent, 13% (10% urban 16% rural) prefer a boy, and 21% (22% urban and 18% rural) want a girl. Hesketh points out that with the consideration of advantages of raising girls, including that they are easier to care for, easier to find a spouse for, and take good care of aging parents, gender indifference and girl preference increase in comparison with previous son preference.

In the context of lower fertility and birth rates within China, the politics of gender equality have undergone an ambiguous, yet palpable change. With lower numbers of children requiring domestic responsibility, it might be assumed that women are able to break out of the childcare roles expected of them more often. However, studies have shown that social pressures placed on a single child limit (i.e. the tendency to view ones only child as the "be-all-end-all" heir on which the success of the family hinges) have created social pressures on mothers as well. Furthermore, lower fertility rates and higher rates of education work against the decline of Chinese cultural son preferences, which in turn create a more imbalanced sex ratio. Before the one child policy, with the advent of family planning, the encouragement of later marriages, lowered fertility rates, and more men than women also increased female sex trafficking; prostitution could be seen as a source of income for families with a single female child, or an opportunity for forced marriage in the case of wifeless men.

== See also ==
- Heihaizi
- Abortion in China
- Female infanticide in China
- Feminism in China
- List of Chinese administrative divisions by gender ratio
- One-child policy
- Prostitution in China
- Rural society in the People's Republic of China
- Sex trafficking in China
- Urban society in the People's Republic of China
- Women's healthcare in the People's Republic of China

=== General ===
- Sex-selective abortion
- Women in China
- Missing women of Asia
