= Dagongmei =

Female workers who had migrated across China

Dagongmei (Chinese: 打工妹; lit. 'working little sisters') are Chinese female workers who have domestically migrated into Chinese cities. This term emerged during the post-Mao Reform Period (1978-) and is still a relevant term in the present day. Its purpose was to denote a new kind of labor relation that distinguishes itself from the labor relations during the Mao Era.

The legal age for these workers is eighteen, but sometimes sixteen and seventeen-year-olds could work for shorter periods. These rural women migrated from the countryside to urban sectors to become workers and they mostly traveled alone. The illegality of hiring these young girls often involved borrowed IDs and many girls never trusted others, only giving out fake names and personal information.

Not every working woman in the city can be called "dagongmei". Dagongmei were not female white-collared workers in the city, but rather, they must display "the double characteristics of being a peasant and a woman," which illustrates their marginal and vulnerable position in the urban society.

== Definition ==
To break down the meaning, dagong means "selling labor" and mei means "younger sister." Mei also implies that these young women were usually unmarried and single.

== Historical Context ==
=== Post-Mao Economic Reforms ===
Deng Xiaoping, the successor after Mao Zedong's death, implemented the "Four Modernizations" movement in 1978, which was meant to modernize China through advancements in science, agriculture, industry, and defense. In the late 1970s, China experienced major economic reforms that altered the economy from state-controlled to state-regulated. The decollectivization of communes resulted in market expansion, providing more opportunities for rural people to get involved in the market. This market economy encouraged both private businesses and rural markets to flourish. Farmers were able to extend their labor towards more profitable commodities, which largely contributed to the growth of the economy. Foreign investments and business played a large role in strengthening China's economy. The open-door policy in 1978 sought to introduce foreign capital and technology to the Chinese market. Special economic zones were established in response to support foreign investments and businesses.

The hukou system (户口), or household registration system, was set up by the Chinese government back in 1958 to restrict internal migration from rural to urban. But, in the late 1970s, the economic reforms allowed rural farmers to contribute to the market, making food available in the local markets nationwide. The state encouraged the domestic migration of the rural people toward the cities in hopes that they would contribute to the newly established market, which resulted in the largest migration movement ever. This migration took place in the early 1980s and heightened in the 1990s. The hukou system no longer became the major barrier between the urban and rural as the emergence of the market made it possible for them to work and earn money. Gradually, rural migrants made up a significant portion of the urban workforce and 40% of the migrants were dagongmei. As these reforms opened up jobs and encouraged migrant workers to migrate, dagongmei took advantage of these opportunities, especially those in the special economic zones.

== Gender and Dagongmei ==
Dagongmei experienced gendered division and feminization when working in urban settings. These are often reflected through their occupations and how they were treated in the workplace.

=== Gender Division of Dagongmei Within the Workplace ===
Dagongmei worked many different types of labor in the cities and were often separated from the male migrant laborers. As China established special economic zones and other newly industrialized sectors in the 1980s, dagongmei dominated the workforce in those areas. These unique zones largely employed female migrant workers in industries related to electronics, clothing, or toy manufacturing as well as in businesses like retail or hospitality. In addition, these women were involved in sex work or domestic services. On the other hand, males either worked technical-related or dead-end jobs, like drivers, cooks, or construction workers. The pay between dagongmei and male migrant workers was unequal. Already earning less than the urban workers, dagongmei only earned 72% of what their male counterparts earned.

=== The Feminization of Dagongmei ===
Many factory bosses were more willing to hire female workers than male workers because of both their young, attractive image and cheap labor. Dagongmei dominated industrial labor, making up more than 70% of the workers. Largely influenced by China's patriarchal culture, society created female expectations that women were submissive, compliant, and cheap; therefore, they became the most desirable workers in China's market economy. This belief continued to be practiced regardless if female workers were obedient or not because submissiveness was often a feminine trait that was pinned on them in the workplace. In the workplace, female migrant workers were repeatedly reminded of their femininity and how they were meant to maintain the expectations of being a woman, which involved motherhood, wifehood, and familial affairs. Superiors would degrade any female worker who would show signs of maleness, warning and saying to them that boys are lazy and troublesome, so they should not display those qualities. Moreover, they emphasize that dagongmei should treat their work with as much care as they would display when they have their own family, which hints that these female workers were still meant to be wives and take care of familial affairs.

In regards to sex work and prostitution, many rural women relied on their youthful attractiveness to earn a livelihood, but this occupation only further emphasizes the feminization of dagongmei. These jobs of being a bar girl, streetwalker, or hotel worker often stressed the importance of the feminine image. Not only was sex work a part of these occupations, but companionship was also a major task that many dagongmei interpreted as part of their main job description.

== The Social Mobility of Dagongmei ==
Although much of the dagongmei's motives for social mobility were more state-driven and encouraged, many of them were still more ambitious and determined about upward mobility in the urban environment than their male counterparts. In the Chinese tradition, sons would return home with their wives, forever remaining in their home village together. Moreover, rural parents depended on their sons for income and physical agricultural labor, leaving the daughters to the side. Because daughters were not expected to hold the same expectations as sons were, it gives them more freedom to pursue their desires without feeling bound to home.

=== Education ===
For dagongmei, social mobility was the ticket to surviving the urban lifestyle. Therefore, they had to find ways to educate themselves to adapt and obtain better jobs. Not all women had formal education because of the traditional bias against daughters. Rural women had very limited knowledge and practice in writing, which often prevented them from expressing themselves. Having a proper education increased their chances of moving up the social ladder, and thus, the ability to flip the family structure.

As the reform period shifted towards technology, computer skills were essential to understand, and many rural women worked hard to learn them. Many of them also pursued a university education. Another aspect that helped dagongmei move upward was the power of language as it functioned within the hierarchy of the factory. Despite Mandarin being the national language of China, Cantonese rapidly became the superior language in the business world, becoming the official commercial language and having the upper hand in the industrial workplace. Cantonese became increasingly popular because of how state power gave way to local market forces, impacting social life as Cantonese is gradually incorporated into these settings. As a result, many female migrant workers pursued to master Cantonese while trying to erase their own rural dialect as well so that they become more suitable in the urban setting.

=== Determination to Improve Social Status ===
The suppression of rural women from Confucian teachings of submission to men or foot-binding before the post-Mao reform period was one of many reasons why women were more determined to improve during this time of economic reform and opportunity. Some aspects that they would focus on improving would be their outward and behavioral appearance as well as their resistance to societal and rural conformity.

The outward appearance was a noticeable feature of rural women because of how differently they dressed and acted compared to urban women. First-time female migrant workers were identifiable due to their simple appearance and inappropriate, mannerless behavior in the workplace. They have a desire to pursue a more modernized appearance so that they can embody the title dagongmei, for this term represents the modernization of female, rural migrant workers. The popular media illustrate this modernized dagongmei imagery of a sexy, successful woman, a kind of rags to riches narrative. There were classes that catered to dagongmei, teaching them about eating and sitting etiquette. In addition, these classes also taught dagongmei how to properly drink alcohol and play drinking games in a social gathering environment. This desire to portray a more modernized look showcases China's modernization and urbanization impacts on dagongmei.

In terms of resistance, many dagongmei showcased their ability to be strong-willed and stubborn. They embodied a great ambition to improve their lives, refusing to accept defeat and fate when encountering a dead end. They resisted going back to their rural homes and listening to their parents, especially when it came down to planning arranged marriages. Their strong desire to leave their rural life behind pushed them to pursue education and white-collar careers. Moreover, dagongmei were not afraid to leave their factory jobs for something better, like a higher wage or safer working conditions. Their constant change in factory work illustrates their pursuit to go higher and aim for a more beneficial outcome rather than being complacent with doing the same as what other dagongmei were doing.

However, despite dagongmei's efforts in climbing up, much of their ambition and determination were state-influenced. Capitalists exploited their labor, hiring them because of their cheap labor and high demand. However, this exploitation triggered incentives for dagongmei to stay in the city because these opportunities allowed them to come into contact with many urban people, exposing them to the fashion and language of the city quicker, and therefore, they were able to integrate themselves into the urban lifestyle. Needless to say, since these opportunities happened to side with female migrant workers a little more, their pursuit of the urban lifestyle became one of their desires and working goals.

== Marriage Life of Dagongmei ==
The expectations and attitudes of dagongmei towards marriage changed drastically in the post-Mao Reform Period compared to the Mao Era. Popular media, television, and advertisements were filled with feminine adornment and sexual appeal, reflecting the new emphasis on personal life and individual desires. The messages that the media spreads go along the lines of "Your body is your own," "Hold tight to love," or "Control your own fate."

Parental control over marriage weakened as daughters were able to take matters into their own hands and choose who they wish to marry. In the countryside, daughters would already be married off in their early twenties. For those dagongmei who do not make it in the city, they would often return home to be married. On the other hand, marriage for those dagongmei who were successful were more free yet also more difficult. Upwards mobility made marriage more difficult for migrant women as their search for a husband had to be one who matches their high-quality persona. But for many of them, they became stuck in a middle ground where they looked down on the men back home in the countryside, yet they could never get the urban men to look at them as suitable wives. But, despite their hardships in marriage, dagongmei undoubtedly had the freedom to choose their love life without the pressure of family, showcasing their autonomy from their rural life.
