= Abortion in China =

Abortion in the People's Republic of China is legal and generally accessible nationwide, but has become subject to increasing restrictions in the 2020s. Abortions are available to most women through China's family planning program, public hospitals, private hospitals, and clinics nationwide. Following the Chinese Communist Revolution and the proclamation of the People's Republic of China in 1949, the country has periodically switched between more restrictive abortion policies to more liberal abortion policies and reversals. Abortion regulations may vary depending on the rules of the province. In an effort to curb sex-selective abortion, Jiangxi and Guizhou restrict non-medically necessary abortions after 14 weeks of pregnancy, while throughout most of China abortions are legal after 14 weeks. Although sex-selective abortions are illegal nationwide, they were previously commonplace, leading to a sex-ratio imbalance in China which still exists.

In the past, virtually universal access to contraception and abortion for its citizens by a national government service was a common way for China to contain its population in accordance with its now-defunct one-child policy. It was scaled back when the policy was removed in 2015 in favor of a two-child policy and in turn was replaced by a three-child policy in 2021. In 2021, China announced it would reduce abortions for non-medical purposes. In 2022, in an effort to boost the country's birth rate, the National Health Commission announced that it would direct measures toward reducing non-medically necessary abortions. The policy was viewed as a response to China's declining birth rate. In 2023, a court ruled in favor of spousal consent for abortion.

== History ==
Chinese folk religion did not contain moral condemnations against infanticide or abortion. Despite Buddhist values that regard life as beginning at birth, traditional Chinese medicine defined life as beginning when the fetus had both a physical form and spiritual identity. As a result, although public debates over abortion policy have sometimes been contentious, they rarely involve strong "pro-life" or "pro-choice" views. Historical Chinese discourse on abortion have often revolved around desires for modernization. In the Mao era, for example, government debates generally revolved around the relationship between population size and economic development and disagreements over the efficacy of various family planning mechanisms.

China was one of the first developing countries to legalize abortion when the pregnant woman's health was at risk and make it easily accessible in the 1950s.

As with many other areas of Chinese state policy in the 20th century, abortion and birth control policy and practices has varied over time and location.

=== Late Qing dynasty ===
In the late Qing dynasty, abortion was referred to as duotai, zhuitai (connoting a falling or dropping fetus), or datai (literally meaning "hitting the fetus"). The term duotai, however, became more standardized, encompassing voluntary and forced abortions as well as induced and uninduced miscarriages.

Following defeats in several wars against Japan and Western nations, abortion was banned under the 1910 Great Qing Temporary Criminal Code and Great Qing New Criminal Code as part of a broader legal modernization influenced by Western legal systems. Women who underwent abortions, as well as those who assisted them, were subject to imprisonment or fines. Individuals who induced miscarriages through abuse, coercion or confrontation were also punishable under law. Qing lawmakers argued that abortions disrupted social order and were harmful to the public.

This anti-abortion policy was reinforced as the population declined by approximately 50 million from Qianlong’s reign to the late Qing era. Chinese nationalists began transitioning towards natalism, spreading the belief that a larger population would strengthen the nation and enhance its ability to excel.

Thus, abortions, during this time, usually stemmed from desperation and done in secret—resulting in risky techniques, abortifacient, carried out by non-medical practitioners.

=== Republican era ===
In China's Republican era, the state continued to emulate the late Qing dynasty reformers and Western governments in imposing a blanket ban on abortion. Performing an abortion was illegal under all versions of the criminal code until 1935, when the Nationalist government allowed abortion for women with life-threatening pregnancies. The events of the Second Sino-Japanese War and the Chinese Civil War prompted the Nationalist government to promote natalism and to restrict birth control access and limit abortion. If a pharmacy or pharmaceutical company advertised the abortifacient properties of drugs, it could be penalized with loss of licensure. Local level governments built on this stringent national framework; Beijing and Shanghai local governments banned promotion and dissemination of drugs with abortifacient, contraceptive, or aphrodisiac properties in 1929, with Tianjin adopting the same restrictions in 1935. In the Kuomintang's view, contraception was also disfavored on the grounds that it encouraged abortion and extramarital sex.

In Republican-era China, Chinese feminists did not universally demand legalization of abortion in China. In the view of some feminists, social conservatives' powerful opposition to abortion de-criminalization would result in a backlash that would harm other efforts to improve women's status in relation to men. Accordingly, in a tactical bid for broader support, many feminist organizations pursued moderate abortion positions.

Ultimately, enforcement of anti-abortion measures during the Republican era were sporadic and varied by locality. Despite their illegality, abortifacients and emmenagogues were not difficult to obtain in major cities. Abortion remained the primary method of fertility control throughout the Republican era. In urban areas, police were permitted to settle abortion cases outside of the standard courtroom process.

=== People's Republic of China ===
Following the proclamation of the People's Republic of China in 1949, the country has periodically switched between more restrictive abortion policies to more liberal abortion policies and reversals.

Initially, like Republican era China, the People's Republic of China also limited birth control access and abortion. At the PRC's founding, the government's view was that more workers were needed to overcome the burdens of China's semi-colonial period and the warfare of the Republican era. Because fertility control had Malthusian associations, the early PRC viewed such efforts as bourgeois and capitalist. Just a few years later however, China began to loosen restrictions on abortion, birth control, and sterilization surgeries. In the early 1950s, the Chinese government permitted abortion when: 1) the mother had a preexisting condition, such as tuberculosis or pernicious anemia, that would cause the pregnancy to be a threat to the mother's life; 2) when traditional Chinese medicine could not settle an overactive fetus and spontaneous abortion was expected; and 3) when the mother had already undergone two or more Caesarean sections. Punishments were written into the law for those who received or performed illegal abortions.

Early abortion policy reformers in the PRC popularized the use of the term rengong liuchan (人工流产, meaning man-made miscarriage) to refer to an abortion procedure. This new term was intended as a break with the term duotai (堕胎, meaning dropping the fetus), which had remained the most frequently used term for abortion during the Republican era. In the view of these reformers, duotai was associated with backward and illegal procedures performed under capitalism, while rengong liuchan conveyed a sense of scientific advancement and modernity.

In 1953, the Ministry of Health under Li Dequan prepared the Regulation of Contraception and Induced Abortion which legalized access to the services in certain conditions. Urban areas had more access to abortion than the rural areas which maintained many restrictions on family planning. In the mid-1950s, abortion laws were further relaxed due to concerns that China's population growth was not sustainable. In 1954 and 1956, the 1953 law was extended to include other pre-existing illnesses and disabilities, such as hypertension and epilepsy, as well as allowing women working in certain types of occupations to qualify. Women who had already had four children and became pregnant four months after giving birth to their last child also qualified for an abortion. Liberalization of abortion laws proceeded at different paces in different localities.

In the 1950s, high-level female Communist Party cadre had a significant role in advocating for greater access to abortion and sterilization surgeries—in their view, women could not "hold up half the sky" nor advance their revolutionary work if they had too many children. During the Hundred Flowers Movement, prominent intellectuals also criticized China's pro-natalist policies. Abortion laws were further liberalized in 1957 by the Ministry of Health. The State Council authorized workers and work unit staff in large cities to have abortions or sterilization surgeries if giving birth would be detrimental to health, although implementation of this policy at local levels was uneven. Later that year, the State Council also legalized abortion and sterilization for healthy workers, although their medical costs were required to be paid out-of-pocket. Also in 1957, Shanghai (and later, other cities) subsidized medical fees for abortion and sterilization.

Despite this, abortion remained restricted in many circumstances and in 1958 many family planning measures were rolled back. In the early 1960s, reproductive rights saw a return in certain areas of China such as Shanghai. However, with the commencement of the Cultural Revolution in 1966, all family planning initiatives were ended.

These restrictions were seen as the government's way of emphasizing the importance of population growth. The scholar Nie Jing-Bao explains that these laws were relaxed in the late 1950s and early 1960s with the intent of reducing the number of deaths and lifelong injuries women sustained due to illegal abortions as well as serving as a form of population control when used in conjunction with birth control.

The proliferation of barefoot doctors, who were frequently sent-down youth, in the early 1970s increased abortion access in rural China. In addition to providing medical care, including abortion, to places which had no health care infrastructure, barefoot doctors also had an important role for disseminating information about birth control.

By the 1970s, abortion was officially termed a "remedial measure" for realizing China's goals of controlling the population. In 1971, abortions and sterilization procedures were provided free of charge and patients were entitled to paid leave. Field work conducted by academic Sarah Mellors Rodriguez suggests that promotion of this initiative may have been uneven, as many of her interviewees were unaware of these policies at the time.

As a result of abortion legalization in China (and India), a majority of Asians have legal access to abortion services.

==== Sex-selective abortion ====
The practice of pre-natal sex determination and sex-selective abortions in China for non-medical reasons are illegal. In 1986, the National Commission for Family Planning and the Ministry of Health prohibited prenatal sex determination except when diagnosing hereditary diseases.Individuals or clinics that violate the prohibition are subject to fines. This prohibition was repeatedly affirmed in the 1980s, 1990s, and early 2000s.

Nevertheless, sex-selective abortions are still relatively commonplace in China, particularly in rural areas, and particularly since the widespread proliferation of ultrasound sex determination in the 1980s. Following decollectivization of rural land in the 1980s, household productivity became more important to rural families' incomes and families therefore preferred sons to maximize revenue now that their rural land was privatized.

Sex-selective abortion continues to be one of the key factors in the notably imbalanced sex-ratio in China; the imbalance cannot be explained solely by the underreporting of female births or by excess female infant mortality. In 2001, 117 boys were born to every 100 girls. These trends are explained by the persistence of a preference for sons in Chinese families.

In 2004, Guizhou enacted a ban on abortions in non-medically necessary cases after 14 weeks of pregnancy in an effort to curb sex-selective abortion.

In 2005, the government began an Action Plan consisting of ten policies with the aim of normalizing the sex ratio of newborns by 2010. Under this plan, sex-selective abortion was outlawed, as was prenatal sex diagnosis, and harsher punishments were implemented for violating both. Other policies include controlling the marketing of ultrasonic B machines and improving the systems used by medical and family planning organizations to report on births, abortions, and pregnancies.

In Jiangxi, women beyond 14 weeks of pregnancy are required to obtain approval from three medical professionals stating that the procedure is medically necessary. Jiangxi officials state that the policy is intended to prevent sex-selective abortion.

==== Forced abortion ====
During China's former one-child policy, some local governments conducted forced implantation of IUDs, sterilizations, abortions, and labor induction followed by infanticide to enforce the policy. In 2012, the forced abortion of Feng Jianmei became known internationally. Forced abortion has also been conducted upon Uyghur women in re-education camps and elsewhere. The 1990 Barin uprising was precipitated by 250 forced abortions imposed upon Uyghur women by the Chinese government.

==== Restrictions in the 2020s ====
In 2021, the China Family Planning Association, an official Chinese Communist Party-backed organization and China's chief administrative authority, the State Council, published new national guidelines with the goal of reducing abortion for non-medical reasons. The organization recommended that provincial governments should aim to reduce the number of abortions performed for "non-medical purposes" and promote instead alternate methods of contraception and birth control, and increase spending on social programs aimed at improving access to pre-pregnancy health care services and post-childbirth family planning services. However, restrictions on birth control methods have occurred, such as the limiting of access to vasectomies. That change in policy is seen by many analysts as being motivated by the declining birth rate in China.

In August 2022, the National Health Commission announced that it would direct measures toward "reducing abortions that are not medically necessary" in an effort to boost the country's birth rate through a number of measures, including expanded pre-pregnancy healthcare, infant care services, and local government efforts to boost family-friendly work places. The National Health Authority furthermore said it would guide local governments to gradually include assisted reproductive technology in its national medical system, because technology such as IVF is typically very expensive in China and not accessible to unmarried women.

In 2023, a court in Chengdu ruled that abortion without spousal consent or "legitimate reasons" constitutes a "violation of men's right to reproduction", entitling the man plaintiff in this case to the right to demand a compensation for the abortion.

== Statistics ==
Percentage of conceptions which led to abortion in China

The abortion rate in China remained relatively low into the early 1960s, although it increased to 5.3% in 1958 and 8.4% in 1962. Generally, research attributes those increases to the birth planning campaigns that occurred contemporaneously.

By 1975, the abortion rate in China was 22.3%, nearly double what it had been only four years earlier. One reason for this increase was the greater abortion access in rural China as a result of barefoot doctors. The frequency of abortion continued to increase steadily throughout the 1970s and early 1980s. By 1988, almost 17% of Chinese women had undergone abortions.

Abortion rates have generally varied between urban and rural areas. According to analysis by academic Thomas Scharping, urban abortion rates were generally higher than rural rates during the 1980s, while in the 1990s abortion use in rural areas outpaced urban areas as a result of increased prevalence in rural areas that previously had low abortion rates.

China now has one of the highest abortion rates in the world. In 2015, approximately 13 million abortions were performed annually. National Health Commission of China reported that more than 9 million abortions are performed annually in China as of 2018. In 2020, the number of abortions in China was just under 9 million.

The Guttmacher Institute, a research organization that promotes abortion rights, released a study in which it estimated China's abortion rate for the years of 2015-2019 was at a rate of 49 abortions per 1000 reproductive-aged women, one of the highest rates in Eastern and Southeastern Asia.

According to local studies in China, most Chinese women who elect abortions have never had children.

== Abortion methods ==
During the Mao era, Chinese abortion and birth control methods varied greatly in practice, with women and couples variously combining techniques based on Western medicine, traditional Chinese medicine, and folk tradition.

For much of the 20th century, intentional overdose of the malaria medicine quinine was a common method for women in China (as well as other countries) to terminate a pregnancy.

Pharmacist interviews conducted by academic Sarah Mellors Rodriguez in 2019 suggest that use of over-the-counter medications and emergency contraception have largely replaced usage of herbal abortifacients.

Abortion's importance as a family planning tool is evident in today's China through the extensive implementation of medical abortions (abortion induced by pills, which can be performed in early pregnancy). The use of abortion pills is promoted by Chinese doctors due to its high efficacy rates (90-97% for domestically produced mifepristone, 95% for domestically produced RU-485) and its much less invasive nature compared to surgical abortion. Since at least 2001, China has banned drugstore sales of mifepristone (RU-486) tablets, while the drug can be procured and used legally under the care of a doctor at a certified hospital.

== See also ==
- Abortion in Hong Kong
- Female infanticide in China
- List of Chinese administrative divisions by gender ratio
