= Family planning policies of China =

Population planning policy of China

Family planning
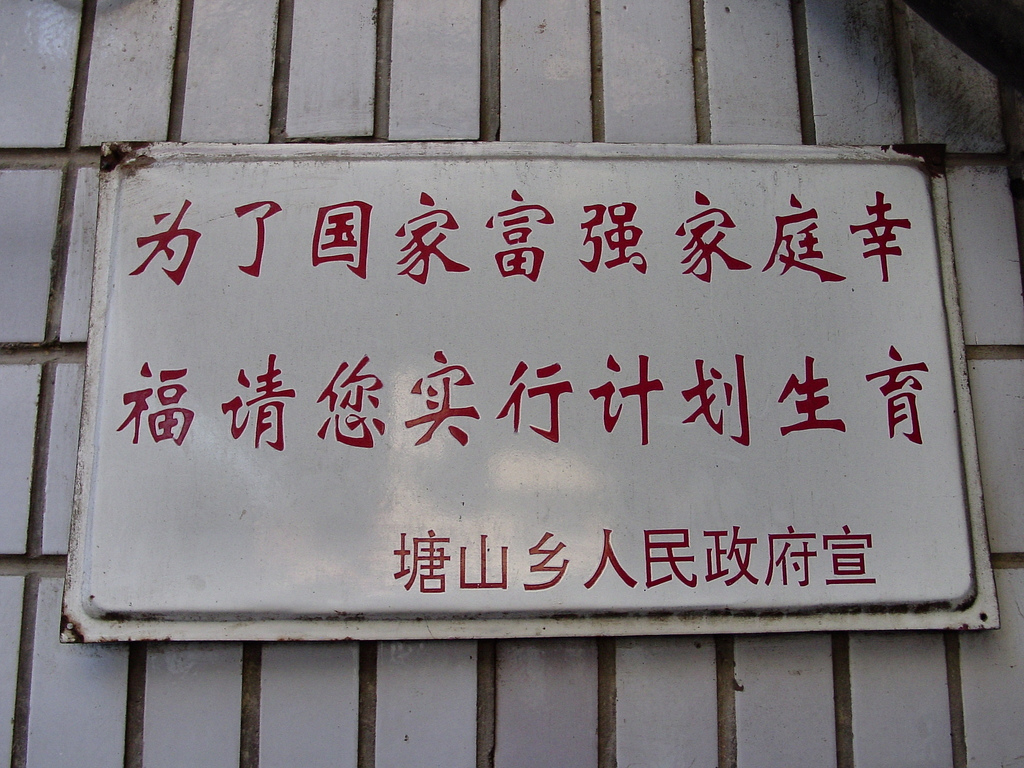
- A government sign in Tangshan Village, De'an County, Jiujiang, Jiangxi: "For the sake of the country's prosperity and families' happiness, please implement family planning"
- Traditional Chinese: 計劃生育
- Simplified Chinese: 计划生育
- Literal meaning: Planning fertilization
Transcriptions
Standard Mandarin
- Hanyu Pinyin: Jìhuà shēngyù
- Bopomofo: ㄐㄧˋㄏㄨㄚˋ ㄕㄥㄩˋ

Family planning policies historically enacted by the People's Republic of China have included specific birth quotas (three-child policy, two-child policy, and the one-child policy) as well as harsh enforcement of such quotas. Together, these elements constitute the population planning program of China. China's program should not be confused with the family planning programs instituted in other countries, which were designed to encourage parents to have the number of children they desired—in China, the provision of contraception through family planning programs was subservient to a birth planning program under which the government designated how many births parents could have in order to control the size of its population.

In CCP Chairman Mao Zedong's time, the Chinese Communist Party (CCP) had an ambiguous and changing attitude toward family planning, especially during the Great Leap Forward. Family planning was first introduced in the 1950s as a "recommendation," yet had never been strictly implemented until 1970, when the Military Control Commission of China's Ministry of Health announced that contraceptives would be provided free of charge, and Chinese Premier Zhou Enlai enacted population growth targets for urban and rural areas, respectively. Malthusian concerns continued, with two-child restrictions starting in the early 1970s under the later-longer-fewer program.

After Mao died in 1976, the policy evolved into the one-child policy in 1979, when a group of senior leaders decided that existing birth restrictions were insufficient to cope with what they saw to be an overpopulation crisis. But the one-child policy allowed many exceptions and ethnic minorities below 10 million people were exempt.

In late 2015, the remnants of one-child limits were lifted and reverted to two-child limits as had been in place during the 1970s. In May 2021, the general secretaryship of Xi Jinping formally introduced the three-child policy to replace the two-child policy. Two months later, in July 2021, the government abolished all birth quotas and financial penalties for births nationwide.

== History ==
Birth planning policy in China was not a top-down process that developed in a linear fashion. As academic Sarah Mellors Rodriguez writes, the policy process was "circuitous, convoluted, and contested." It was implemented by state actors and institutions, as well as non-state bodies and ordinary communities, families, and individuals.

=== Mao Zedong era ===
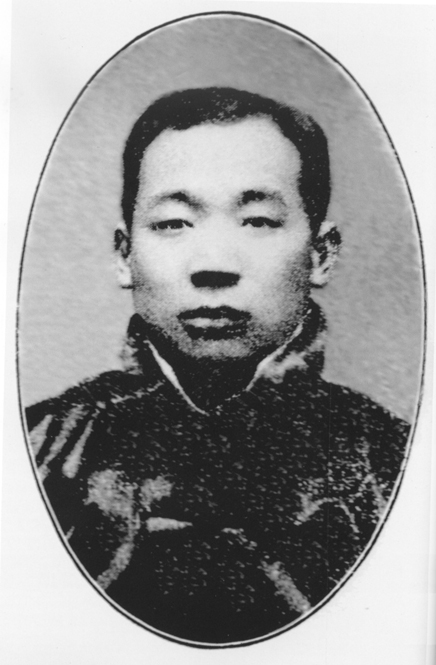
Ma Yinchu, the father of China's family planning

Shortly after the founding of the People's Republic of China in October 1949, Mao Zedong and the Chinese Communist Party encouraged Chinese people to have many children, imitating policies such as Mother Heroine from the Soviet Union. The Chinese communist government condemned birth control and banned imports of contraceptives.

In 1953, the First National Population Census of China was conducted upon the suggestion of Ma Yinchu, then President of Peking University. The result showed a total population of more than 600 million (some 100 million increase from the number in 1949) as well as rapid growth of the population, with an annual increase rate of over 2.2%. As a result, the family planning policies were approved and recommended by the Chinese government.

China's first birth planning campaign began in 1954 with the repeal of the ban on contraception, although official efforts to promote the birth planning campaign did not begin in earnest until 1956. The PRC also oversaw a linguistic and conceptual shift in the language of contraception, avoiding terminology that had been popular in Republican-era China (such as shengyu kongzhi or shengyu jiezshi, which both directly translate the phrase "birth control") and instead adopting phrases like jihua shengyu (with the literal meaning of planned birth) and biyun (pregnancy prevention). In the PRC's view, the previous terminology had passive connotations, while the new terminology connoted a proactive approach. This linguistic shift was also intended to help influence a change in the primary mode of fertility control from abortion (which had been the most frequent method in the Republican period) to other forms like condoms and cervical caps.

In 1957, Mao started to change his attitude and Ma, who supported family planning, was widely criticized in the "Anti-rightist Campaign and was forced to resign as the president of Peking University in 1960. In 1958, Mao launched the Great Leap Forward and began to promote population growth again, saying it was still good to have more people. The Great Leap Forward led to the Great Chinese Famine (1959–1961), during which approximately 15-55 million people died.

Then in 1962, a baby boom followed, and the Second National Population Census in 1964 showed a total population of around 700 million in mainland China. In 1962, the government began to promote family planning again, but it was rather ineffective and was interrupted by the Cultural Revolution starting in 1966. As a result, the population increase rate in China remained very high.

In the period prior to the Cultural Revolution, China sought to promote birth planning through art, entertainment, and posters. Trade unions, factories, the All-China Women's Federation, and local organizations hosted birth planning exhibitions. The Tianjin Foreign Trade Committee, for example, held an exhibition of 124 billboards explaining the benefits of delaying marriage, using birth control, use of IUDs, abortion procedures, and sterilization surgeries. Organized group conversations and cultural activities were also used to challenge the traditional Chinese preference for sons over daughters and for early marriage and achieved some success in this regard.

In the late 1950s, Shanghai established neighborhood committees to promote birth planning, along with women's literacy and employment. Workers from these neighborhood committees went door-to-door to address individual concerns about birth control. This method was adopted in other cities by the early 1960s and expanded to the establishment of local birth planning offices.

By the mid-1960s, urban fertility rates were declining, primarily as a result of developmental factors including increases in education and state welfare benefits. Rural fertility rates continued to be high. In 1971, the country's total population reached 852 million. In that year, Mao's attitude changed again, and the government began to promote family planning more sufficiently, causing the annual increase rate to drop below 2% after 1974. The policies at the time encouraged two children per family, and the slogan was "Late, Long, and Few" or "wan, xi, shao (晚, 稀, 少)," meaning late marriage and childbearing, birth spacing (at least 3 years between two births), and fertility limitation (no more than two children). Men were encouraged to marry at age 25 or later, and women were encouraged to marry at age 23 or later. Early 1970s promotion of family planning also emphasized the slogan, "Three is too many, one is not enough -- two is perfect." These policies were recommendations and compliance with them was voluntary.

The fertility rate among urban families decreased from three children in the early 1970s to two children by the mid-1970s.

The proliferation of barefoot doctors in the early 1970s increased abortion access in rural China and served as an important means of disseminating information about birth control and abortion.In 1974, the central government required that contraception, including oral birth control, condoms, and cervical caps, be distributed free of charge in rural China, especially among sent-down youth. According to academic Sarah Mellors Rodriguez, the success of this distribution campaign likely varied greatly by region.

By the time Mao died in 1976, the population in China had exceeded 900 million. Trends in promoting birth planning through art continued after Mao's death. Under Hua Guofeng, a collection of songs, short plays, and skits relating to birth control was published as a volume titled Compilation of Birth Planning Literature and Art Propaganda Materials.

=== One-child policy ===
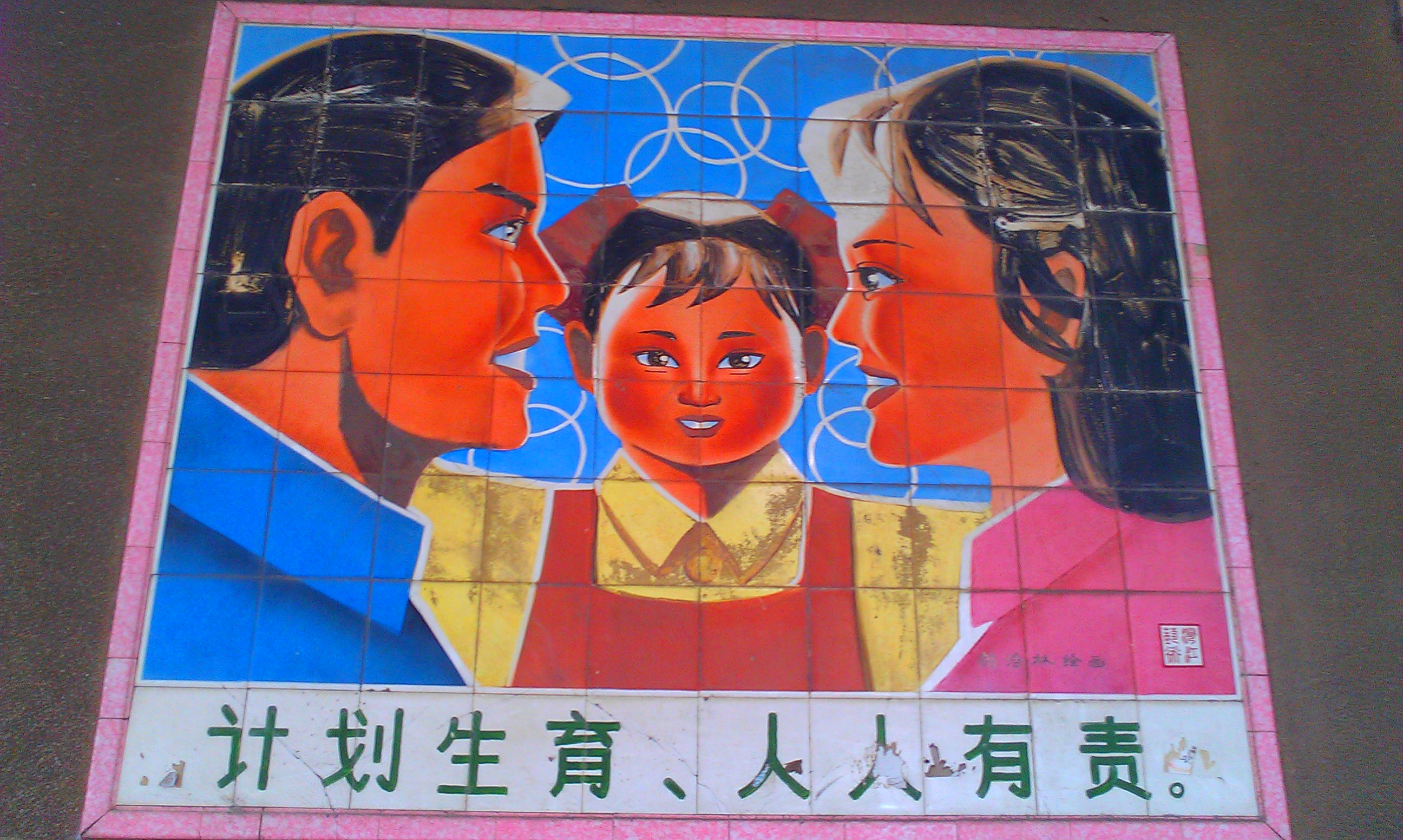
A propaganda painting of family planning (Jiangmen, Guangdong Province).

Starting in 1979, given the overpopulation crisis at the time, China's new paramount leader Deng Xiaoping, together with other senior leaders, including elder Chen Yun, Premier Zhao Ziyang, and President Li Xiannian, began to promote the so-called one-child policy in mainland China. In the late spring of 1979, Chen became the first leader to propose the one-child policy, saying on 1 June that:

Comrade Xiannian proposed to me planning "better one, at most two". I'd say be stricter, stipulating that "only one is allowed". Prepare to be criticized by others for cutting off the offspring. But if we don't do it, the future looks grim.

On 15 October 1979, Deng met with a British delegation led by Felix Greene in Beijing, saying that "we encourage one child per couple. We give economic rewards to those who promise to give birth to only one child." The policy soon began to be enforced nationwide, with some exceptions made for ethnic minorities and rural families. In particular, Ma Yinchu was rehabilitated during the Boluan Fanzheng period. In 1982, the Third National Population Census showed that the population in China had reached 1 billion, and at the end of the year, family planning became a fundamental policy in China (基本国策) as well as a constitutional duty. Given the crowded conditions of cities and a shortage of housing, urban people generally accepted the One-child policy. By 1982, 96% of urban families were having one child. The policy was incorporated into the Constitution in 1982.

The one-child policy had various exemptions, including twins, families whose first child was disabled, rural families who could have more children due to the necessities of farm work, and ethnic minorities. The strict limitation of one child applied to approximately 35% of China's population.

The 1980 Marriage Law described birth planning as a national duty.

Leaders after Deng, mostly the administrations of Jiang Zemin and Hu Jintao, continued promoting and imposing the one-child policy in most areas of mainland China.

In 1991, the central government made family-planning goals the direct responsibility of local governments.

Also in the early 1990s, experts from leading population-research institutes began appealing to policymakers to relax or end the one-child policy.

Since the 1990s, government efforts to promote son/daughter equality in family planning and to eliminate the traditional son preference have increased. They further accelerated after the United Nations-sponsored Caring for Girls national campaign in 2003.

From 1990 to 2010, the population in China grew from 1.13 billion (the Fourth National Population Census) to 1.34 billion (the Sixth National Population Census), with a very low total fertility rate. In 2007, 36% of China's population was subject to a strict one-child restriction, with an additional 53% being allowed to have a second child if the first child was a girl. Provincial governments imposed fines for violations, and the local and national governments created commissions to raise awareness and carry out registration and inspection work. However, over the years, the one-child policy had created much controversy, even within mainland China, especially over the human rights abuses due to its strict measures.

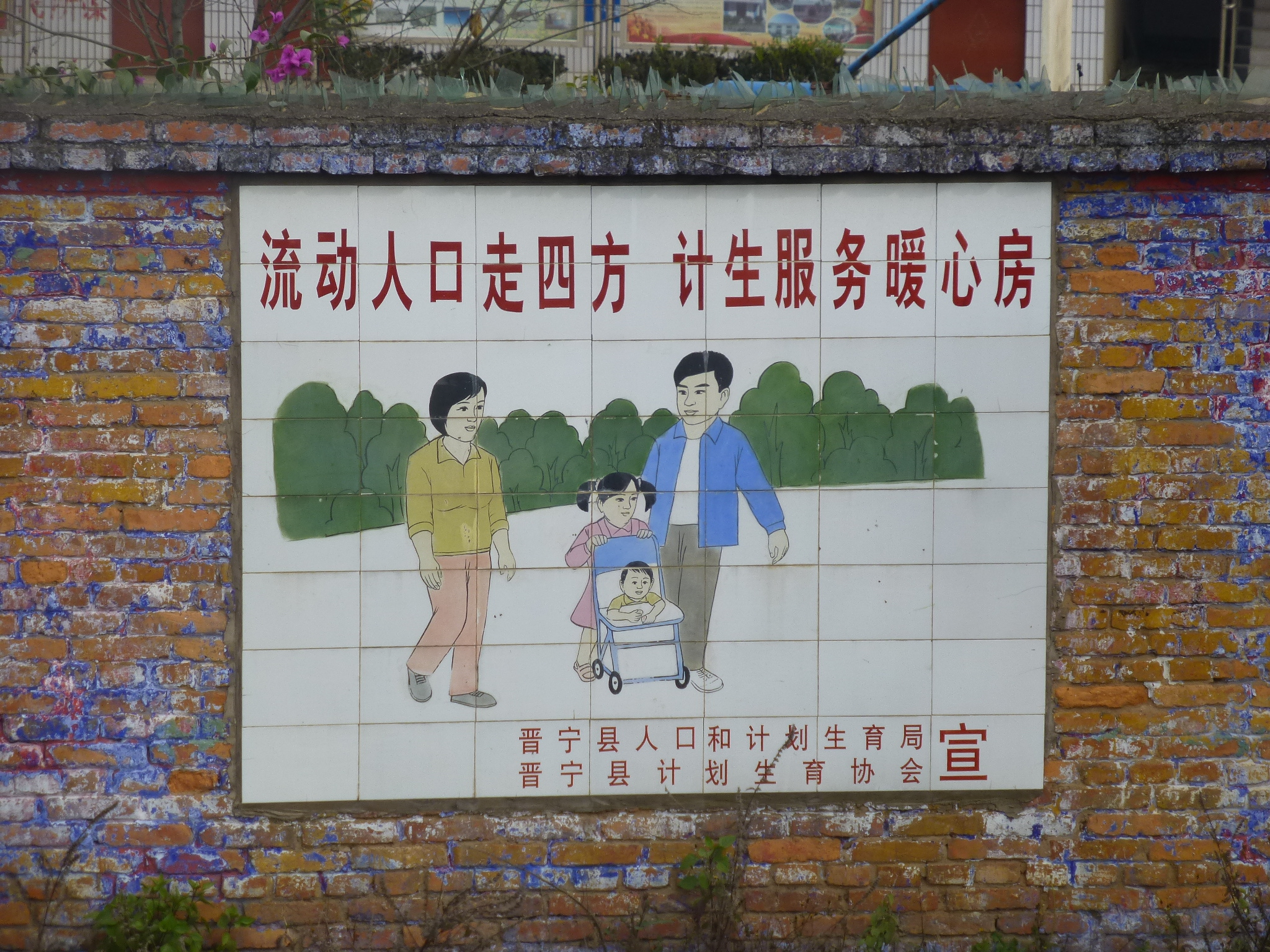
A propaganda painting of the family planning policy (Jinning, Yunnan Province).

According to the Chinese government (2007 & 2013), some 400 million births had been prevented due to its population control program since the 1970s. Some observers have called this estimate "bogus". However, the alternate model of 16 comparator countries proposed by these observers to refute the official estimate implies instead that China's population today is some 600 million fewer due to the program since 1970. Current debates are not about the impact of the overall program but rather, the relative contribution of one-child limits to that program. To date, critics of China's official estimate have yet to acknowledge just how large an impact the overall program has had. Previously, the fine was the so-called "social maintenance fee," and it was a punishment for families who had more than one child. According to the policy, the families who violate the law may bring a burden to the whole society. Therefore, the social maintenance fee will be used for the operation of the basic government.

In 2013, an additional exception was added to the policy to permit a second child if both parents were only children.

As of 2015, after nearly four decades of harsh enforcement, the one-child policy brought profound social and economic consequences that included a national gender imbalance due to the preference of male children for females, an aging population, and a shrinking workforce.

=== Two-child policy ===
On 29 October 2015, it was reported that the existing law would be changed to a two-child policy, citing a statement from the Chinese Communist Party. From 1 January 2016, the policy had become effective following its passage in the standing committee of the National People's Congress on 27 December 2015. The reason the government decided to implement a two child policy instead of abolishing the limitations on child birth in general, was because they were scared of a baby boom occurring. The benefits of this policy is that it would allow families to have their preferred amount of children, significantly limit the amount of abortions and provide a stable sex ratio. In May 2015 1.5 million of the 11 million eligible couples submitted applications in order to be eligible to have a second child. Through recent research under the two-child policy the percentage of people over the age of 65 is estimated to increase to 42%.

The two-child policy may have been created due to the concerns of population aging, although analyzing this policy from an environmental view point, it may have drastic effects. When the Chinese Communist Party decided to relax this policy and allow two children per a household, it made their carbon neutrality goal significantly harder to reach by 2060. The workforce will not be affected from the increase from the one child policy to the two child policy, during the short term aspects. Although it will slowly decline from the creation of the policy until 2020 and then moderately decline from 2020 to 2030. After 2030 this is when the benefits of the two child policy will become evident as this is when the elderly dependent ration will decrease. In terms of the average water resource and farmland per a person it is predicted that these valuables will reach its lowest value in the year 2029, by about 2% and 6% respectively. The air pollution in China has been publicized due to its high levels and strenuous affects on the Chinese community. Through enacting the two-child policy it is going to cause a high increase of about 8% in gross domestic product use. China is in the works of building vast amounts of coal plants in order to manage their coal usage, though reports state that there has been a 17% influx of coal usage after stating their goals. China wants to lower their carbon usage although having more people in the workforce will produce economic growth, making these carbon goals harder to reach. The household in China contribute to 34% of the national carbon footprint during a study done in 2012. It is fair to say that "Carbon inequality declines with economic growth in China," due to the carbon foot print Gini in 2007 of 0.44 to 0.37 during 2012. In comparison to the released documentation of income dropped slightly from 0.48 in 2007 to 0.47 in 2008.

An increase in the birth rate occurred in 2016 as the policy was implemented. However, the birthrate decreased again in the following years, reaching the lowest point in 2018, with only 15.23 million newborns.

=== Three-child policy and abolition of limits ===
In May 2021, the Seventh National Population Census showed a total population of 1.41 billion, but some serious issues were revealed, including the continuous decline of the birth rate and population ageing. At the end of the month, the Politburo of the Chinese Communist Party further relaxed its family planning measures to the "three-child policy." Guidance was issued on June 21, 2021, proposing implementation including promoting the "three-child policy" and cleaning up old regulations involving fines for exceeding the birth limit.

On May 31, 2021, The New York Times reported China has shown that the three-child policy can solve the problem of declining birth rates and population crisis that the previous two-child policy failed to solve. Before this, China's restrictive birth policy has led to a shrinking labor force and an aging population. Even so, some experts still believe that the three-child policy is far from enough and China should fully liberalize and vigorously encourage childbirth. But now, most families have become accustomed to the idea that "one child is enough", which is the main factor leading to the decline in fertility. Some people say that even the three-child policy does not make them want more children. The main reason is that raising children is too troublesome and expensive.

Before the three-child policy was announced, many online articles and social media groups about "Tang Ping" were criticized or deleted, claiming that Tang Ping was shameful. Tang Ping represents a lifestyle of giving up hard work and socializing. It stems from the anxiety and pressure of current Chinese society, as well as the pressure of expenses caused by fertility issues. On May 30, many posts and groups containing Tang Ping on Douban were removed. Xinhua News Agency also deleted many comments related to the three-child policy in the Weibo comment area. However, the discussion about Tang Ping and the three-child policy has not stopped. More than 180,000 people are still in the Tang Ping group on Baidu Tieba.

Xinhua News Agency launched a poll on Weibo on the afternoon of the day the policy was announced. The title was "Are you ready for the three-child policy?" Xinhua News Agency provided four options for the poll: "Ready and eager to go," "Planning," "Hesitating," and "Not considering it at all." More than 14,000 people participated in the poll, of which 13,000 chose "Not considering it at all," and only a few chose "Ready and eager to go," "Planning," and "Hesitating." The poll was subsequently deleted.

On December 31, 2022, the People's Government of Zezhou County, Jincheng City, Shanxi Province, promulgated a preliminary nine measures. In the eighth point, "Promoting the expansion of compulsory education," it is written that children from families with two or three children who have settled in Zezhou County and are employed can get 10 extra points in the Zhongkao. This policy attracted widespread attention. The Admissions Office of the Zezhou County Education Bureau staff responded that this was just an unimplemented policy because the extra points would not be taken until more than a decade later. In early 2023, the policy was revised from the extra points for students to financial compensation for families.

But the new policy does not contribute much to reversing the trend of decreasing birth rate. Instead, China has seen population drop for the first time in over 60 years in 2022, with a drop of 850,000 people. The drop in population in China has increased to over 2 million in 2023. In April 2023, India overtook China to become the world's most populous country.

== Pro-natalist policies ==
General Secretary of the Chinese Communist Party Xi Jinping has promoted pro-natalist policies and encouraged women to "actively foster a new type of marriage and childbearing culture." Accompanying the two-child policy, the central Chinese government and local governments also provided incentives for childbearing to families expecting their first or those eligible to have a second child. Starting in 2017, regional governments in China introduced preferential policies to increase the birth rate, such as reducing taxes, providing subsidies for childcare, and extending paid maternity and paternity leave for both parents.

Examples of regional incentive policies:

- On 26 September 2016, Guangdong, one of the most populated provinces in China, extended the paid maternity leave from 128 to 158 days to 178–208 days (after 26/09/2016).
- On 31 March 2016, Chongqing passed the bill for a 15-day paternity leave and extended the maternity leave to 128 days (originally 98 days) with an add-on that maternity leave is optional until the baby is one year old.
- In 2019, Liaoning, one of the provinces with the lowest population growth rate, passed legislation to not only extend paid maternity leave to 60 days and paternity leave to 15 days, but also provide subsidies for preschool education.
- In August 2022, the National Health Commission announced that it would direct measures toward "reducing abortions that are not medically necessary" in an effort to boost the country's birth rate.
- On January 1, 2026, China ended the value-added tax (VAT) exemption for contraceptive drugs and devices, a policy that had been in place since 1994. These products are now subject to the standard 13% VAT applied to most consumer goods.

== Ethnic minority policies ==
Initially, when China's One-Child Policy was instituted in 1979, the restrictions had largely applied to Han Chinese, while ethnic minorities were generally exempt. For decades, minorities had faced fewer or no birth restrictions. In 2017, the Chinese government declared a new framework to promote "Ethnic Equality" and revised the regulations to now apply the exact same restrictions to everyone "regardless of their ethnicity". China's state-owned media Global Times reported that in the Xinjiang region, the new regulations permitted urban couples to have two children, while rural couples could have three children.

In July 2021, China formally removed all birth quotas and financial penalties for births nationwide, ending the family planning limits for both Han Chinese and ethnic minorities.

== See also ==
- Population Ageing
- Aging of China
