= Aging of China =

Rapidly aging population in China

China's population pyramid, 2023 to 2100, as projected by the United Nations in 2022

China's population is aging faster than almost all other countries in modern history. In 2050, the proportion of Chinese over retirement age will become 39 percent of the total population according to projections. China is rapidly aging at an earlier stage of its development than other countries. Current demographic trends could hinder economic growth and create challenging social issues in China.

In 1979, the Government of China established a controversial one-child policy aimed at curbing the high fertility rate. With economic development, the provision of social services, and improved welfare conditions, life expectancy in China has also increased. These two factors have directly contributed to China's aging population, which has significant ramifications on China's society, politics, and economy. In October 2015, a two-child policy was introduced in an attempt to deal with the aging problem. In May 2021, the Chinese government introduced the three-child policy in a further attempt to address the issue. In July 2021, all family size limits as well as penalties for exceeding them were removed.

Since 2022, deaths have outstripped births in the country. In 2025, China had 323 million people over age 60, or 23 percent of the population.

== Overview ==
Demographics of China
- Death rate: 7.1 per 1,000 people
- Life expectancy: 77.47 years
- Fertility rate: 1.3 births per woman
- China's demographic information, 2020

From 1950 to 2020, the total fertility rate in China dropped from 6.11 to 1.3 births per woman. The mortality rate also decreased, from 22.2 to 7.1 per 1,000 people. Life expectancy rose from 44.6 to 77.47 years from 1950 to 2020, and is expected to reach about 80 years in 2050.

In 2018, 249.49 million people over 60 years old constituted 17.9 percent of the total population. Chinese state media reported the country's total fertility rate dropped to 1.09 in 2022.

== Causes ==
China's aging population is caused by a low birth rate together with prolonged human life expectancy.

=== Low fertility rates ===
==== One-child policy ====
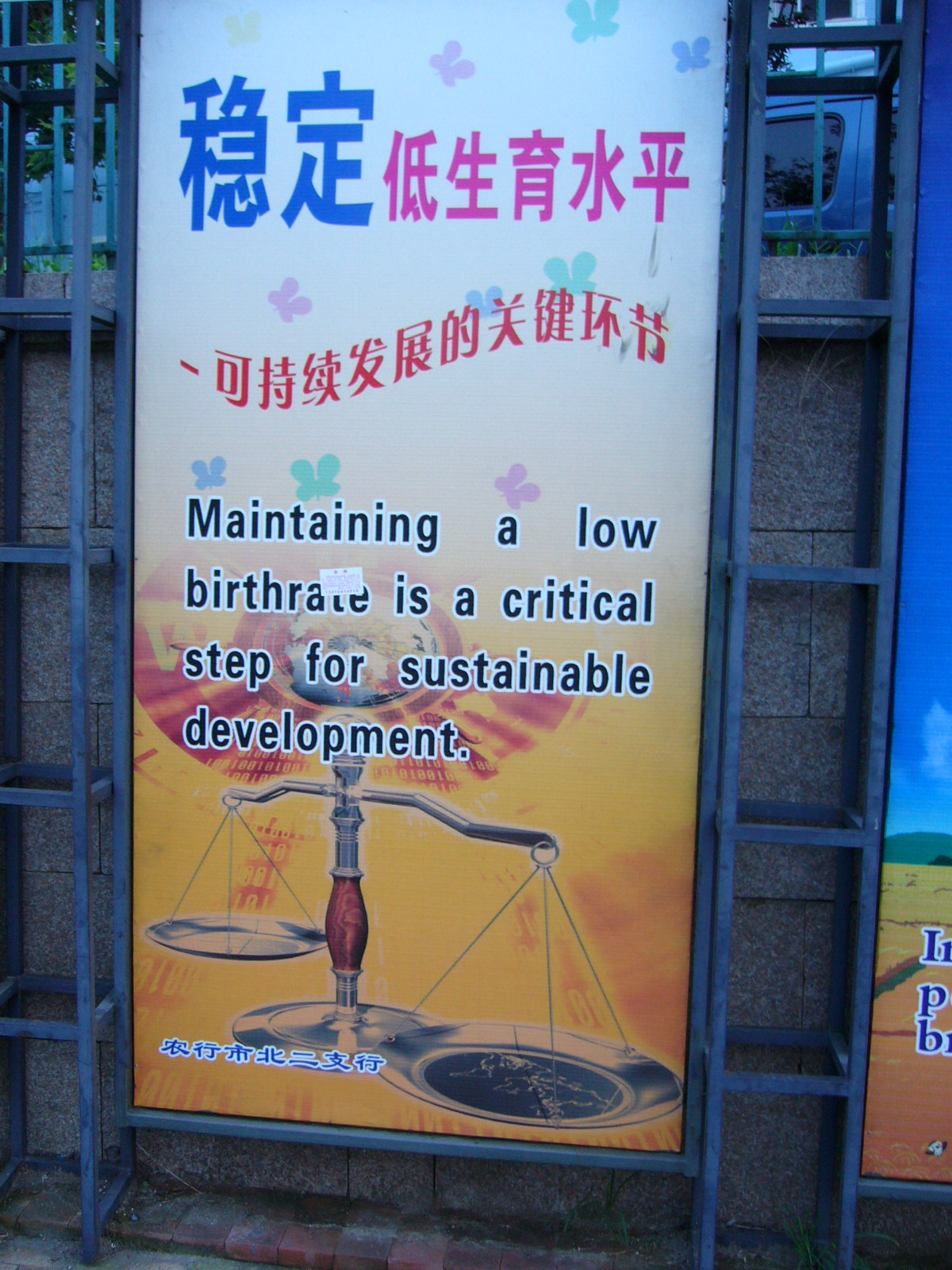
China used the one-child policy to stabilize fertility levels

In order to suppress excessive population growth, the one-child policy was introduced in 1979. The enforcement methods include financial penalties, widespread use of various contraceptive methods, as well as more severe forced abortion and sterilization. As a result, birth rates and population growth rates have drastically decreased. Previously, the fine is so-called "social maintenance fee" and it is the punishment for the families who have more than one child. According to the policy, the families who violate the law may bring the burden to the whole society. Therefore, the social maintenance fee will be used for the operation of the basic government.

==== Reproductive health of couples ====
With economic growth and social development, increasing smoking, alcohol use, unhealthy diets, and psychological stress have an effect on lowering the fertility rates of couples. Pollution in China also has an impact on male sperm count, which has been declining since at least the 1980s. At the Chinese University of Hong Kong, a team of scientists studied the sperms from approximately 6,500 men and found a "strong correlation" between high levels of air pollution and "abnormal sperm shape".

Researchers point out that many particulate matter components are associated with sperm damage in experimental studies. Exposure to air pollutants may cause free radicals to exceed body's regulation ability, adversely altering biologically relevant molecules such as DNA and triggering human diseases. These conditions may be associated with a significant number of infertile couples, lowering the fertility rate.

==== Cultural impact ====
China's sex ratio is the most skewed in the world. The country's ratio of males to females is skewed 3% to 4% higher towards males. In the traditional, patriarchal society, many Chinese people believed that men were more important than women. This mindset has continued to be prevalent in modern China, especially in rural areas, resulting in high female fetal abortion rates and even female infanticide. The imbalance in sex ratio has led to a decrease in marriage rates and birth rates in China.

=== Extension of human life span ===
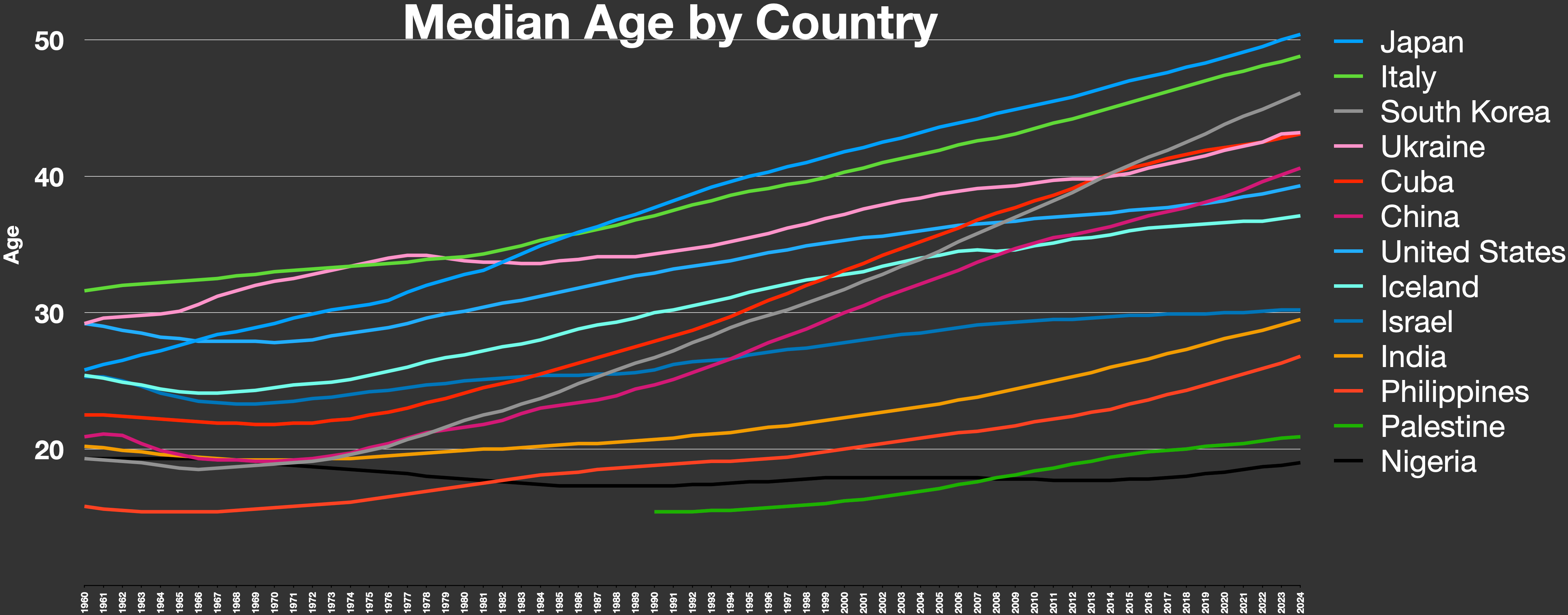
Median age by country

The improvements in social welfare and the medical system have prolonged people's life span. Since 1949, the general health of the Chinese people has greatly improved, and the life expectancy has increased by about 30 years, from 44.6 to 75.3 years from 1950 to 2015. It is expected to reach approximately 80 years in 2050. The minimum income security in rural areas has been expanded and is covering more than 50 million residents in poor areas. The Chinese government has unified the welfare systems of urban and rural migrants, and the pension system covers nearly 700 million people.

Despite the improvement of China's social welfare system, there are still huge inequalities in health between urban and rural areas. Compared with urban peers, the number of medical service providers for rural residents is significantly reduced, and the utilization rate of facilities is low, resulting in their poor health. Since the late 1990s, three new medical insurance systems have been established by the government to provide more health care services. In 2009, urban and rural health insurance reforms achieved greater coverage. More advanced medical techniques have reduced the prevalence of diseases and increased survival.

== Impacts ==
The demographic trend of aging population has social, political and economic ramifications in China. The growth of the elderly population has increased the dependency ratio and the prevalence of many chronic diseases. Aging society has also brought about changes in public policy. The weakening of the labor force has negative impacts on China's economic growth and development, which was originally driven by the labor market.

=== Social ===
According to some analysts, rapid aging may create only a few challenging social problems and does not increase the risk of social instability in China.

Due to the lower fertility rate and extension of the human life span, the population in China is aging faster than almost all other countries. In 2050, the proportion of Chinese over retirement age will become 39 percent of the total population. At that time, its dependency ratio will rise to 69.7%, almost twice as high as that in 2015, which was about 36.6%.

Others consider the issue more serious. The higher dependency ratio is associated with the greater pressure placed on those who are working to support the rest of the population. Even if the Chinese government provides part of the financial support for the elderly through social welfare, such as pensions and public welfare homes, there are still many elderly people in China who are unable to be taken care of. In 2015, there were, on average, 27 beds per 1,000 elderly in nursing homes in China, far fewer than those in the United States or Germany.

The aging population in China has increased the incidence and types of chronic diseases. Chronic diseases include four basic types: cardiovascular diseases, cancer, respiratory diseases, and diabetes. There are nearly 300 million chronic patients in China, half of whom are over 65 years old. During aging, many cellular and molecular events break down and eventually lead to a variety of chronic diseases, such as coronary heart diseases (CHD). The number of CHD incidents and deaths in China will increase dramatically from 2010 to 2029; among Chinese adults aged 35–84, a 64% increase in CHD occurrences is predicted between 2020 and 2029.

=== Political ===
A large number of the elderly population has increased the pressure on the Chinese government to allocate pensions and make social welfare more accessible. The lack of conventional financial infrastructure and the extent of the aging population make it difficult for China to provide a holistic solution. Even at an economic growth rate of 8 percent, pension spending is growing much faster at a rate of 15 percent per year. Pension expenditure increased by 11.6% in 2016, reaching 2.58 trillion yuan, with a shortfall of 429.1 billion yuan, requiring government subsidies.

Since the establishment of the pension system, China has been paying the income of retirees with the contribution of the working population. As more people retire and fewer people enter the labor market, the gap between income and expenditure will continue to widen. China's Working Committee on Ageing suggested that the inclusion of improved care services for the elderly in the national development road-map would be a key measure for the top leadership to cope with population aging. The elderly care service market provides more opportunities for private capital and non-governmental organizations so that the elderly can have more service choices.

In 2022, Peking University and Lancet established a commission on healthy aging in China. The Commission's purpose is to re-focus the debate on aging not just on the risks but on opportunities through "unleashing the intellectual and vocational capacities of the older population and the whole of Chinese society." Also in 2022, the Fudan Institute on Aging was established as a state-level think tank aimed at developing what it describes as Chinese solutions for addressing the problems of aging and Chinese wisdom for coping with an aging society.

Neighborhood committees of the Chinese Communist Party are typically staffed by older volunteers.

=== Geopolitical ===
China's aging population could hinder economic growth, create challenging social problems, and limit its capabilities to act as a new global hegemon.

Ryan Hass of the Brookings Institution said, "China is at risk of growing old before it grows rich, becoming a graying society with degrading economic fundamentals that impede growth." He went on to say, "The working-age population is already shrinking; by 2050, China will go from having eight workers per retiree now to two workers per retiree. Moreover, it has already squeezed out most of the large productivity gains that come with a population becoming more educated and urban and adopting technologies to make manufacturing more efficient."

Nicholas Eberstadt, an economist and demographic expert at the American Enterprise Institute, said that current demographic trends will overwhelm China's economy and geopolitics, making its rise much more uncertain. He said, "The age of heroic economic growth is over." Brendan O'Reilly, a guest expert at Geopolitical Intelligence Services, wrote, "A dark scenario of demographic decline sparking a negative feedback loop of economic crisis, political instability, emigration and further decreased fertility is very real for China".

=== Economic ===
==== Labor force ====
A 2021 World Bank projection of the working-age population in China, 1990–2050.

Since economic expansion is the sum of input factor growth and productivity growth, it will require a substantial increase in labor productivity to sustain the same top-line growth as the population ages. China's aging population has led to a contraction of the labor force that induces a slowing economic growth. In 2017, China's total working-age population (aged between 15 and 64) was 988.3 million, which dropped by a large margin of 70 million from the end of 2016.

By 2024, China had one of the lowest retirement ages among major world economies, with many working women eligible for retirement at 50 and men at 60. China is urged to raise the legal age of retirement to cope with the problem of a reduced labour force. In 2016, the Chinese government announced plans to gradually raise the retirement age from 50 years old to over 60 years old. It may expand productivity and improve the sustainability of national pension accounts by improving the level of education and skills of Chinese workers to make up for the gap from the decreasing proportion of the working-age population. In September 2024, with rising concerns about pension insolvency and a declining workforce, China decided to increase its retirement age across the board, increasing the age of retirement from 60 to 63 for male workers, 55 to 58 for female white collar workers, and 50 to 55 for female blue collar workers. Another measure China has employed to mitigate an aging workforce is to improve labor force quality, boosting university enrollment by seven times from 1999 to 2018 in China.

Aging in China has affected women's labor force participation to a certain extent. A large proportion of grandparents in China provide the free services of raising grandchildren for their children. This constitutes a main reason why women decide to stay in the labor market. China has a relatively high female labor force participation rate of 61.5%.

==== Allocation of government funds ====
An increase in the number of retirees and a decrease in the number of taxpayers will affect the government's allocation of funds. The expansion of the elderly ratio forces the government to support them by providing pensions and expanding social welfare, which will affect the government budget. China's pension funds accounted for nearly 70% of China's social security income in 2017. Without subsidies from the central government, many local pension funds will run into a deficit, of which the total is expected to rise from 234 billion yuan to 534 billion yuan in 2022.

== Government policies ==
In order to alleviate the population aging in China, the Chinese government has relaxed its child limitation policies. Under the amended Article 18 of China's Population and Family Planning Law, every married couple is allowed to have up to three children.

=== Two-child policy ===
In October 2015, the national government relaxed the one-child policy into the two-child policy. China had been taking gradual measures to eliminate the one-child policy. In 2009, if both parents were only children, they were allowed to have two children. In 2014, most provinces in China further relaxed their policies, allowing families to have two children if one of the parents was an only child. However, since the implementation of the two-child policy, there has been no significant improvement in China's population aging. It was expected that the effect of the policy will not be significant until two decades later. After the relaxation of the one-child policy, 17.9 million babies were born in 2016, an increase of 1.3 million over the previous year, but only half of what was expected. In 2017, births fell to 17.2 million, far below the official forecast of more than 20 million.

=== Three-child policy ===
In May 2021, the Chinese government introduced the three-child policy in a further attempt to address the issue. However, the improvement has been limited since the implementation of the policy, largely due to the impact of COVID-19, economic uncertainty and people's current struggles in supporting children as well as old parents.

=== Policy support for the elderly ===
Article 28 of the 1980 New Marriage Law formalizes the obligations of supporting grandparents for those "who can afford it[.]" Reinforcing this responsibility, the 1985 Inheritance Law provides that if a parent dies without a will, the disposition of property is applied heavily in favor of children who cared for the deceased.

The 1996 Law to Protect the Rights and Interests of the Elderly (laonianren quanyi baozhang fa) obligates children to provide for their elderly (defined as aged sixty or greater) parents, including providing housing, living costs, and health care. Article IV prohibits discriminating against, maltreating, and forsaking the elderly.

In 2009, China established a state-sponsored elderly insurance program.

To address the aging of China's population, the Fourteenth Five Year Plan (covering 2021–2025) seeks to expand healthcare and retirement system initiatives.

== See also ==
- Aging of Japan
- Aging of South Korea
