= Three-child policy =

Population-control policy in China

The progression of China's population pyramid, International Futures

The three-child policy (Chinese: 三孩政策; pinyin: Sānhái Zhèngcè), whereby a couple can have three children, is a family planning policy in the People's Republic of China that exists as a formality but is effectively abolished. The policy was announced on 31 May 2021 at a meeting of the Politburo of the Chinese Communist Party (CCP), chaired by CCP General Secretary Xi Jinping, on population aging.

Less than a month after the policy's announcement, on 26 June 2021, the State Council removed all penalties and restrictions for having more children than permitted, leaving the three-child limit a mere formality. This effectively ended child-birth limits in the country, since families could now have as many children as they wished without restriction. The government agency responsible for enforcing childbirth limits, the National Population and Family Planning Commission, was dissolved in 2013, 8 years prior.

The announcement came after the release of the results of the Seventh National Population Census, which showed that the number of births in mainland China in 2020 was only 12 million, the lowest number of births since 1960, and the further aging of the population, against which the policy was born. This was the slowest population growth rate China experienced. The state-owned Chinese news agency, Xinhua, stated that this policy would be accompanied by supportive measures to maintain China's advantage in human labor. However, some Chinese citizens expressed dissatisfaction with the policy, as they would be unable to raise children due to the high cost of living in China relative to the income.

The policy was adopted by the Central Committee of the Chinese Communist Party and State Council of the People's Republic of China in June 2021 and announced in July. In August, the Standing Committee of the National People's Congress amended the Population and Family Planning Law, allowing each couple to have three children and cancelling restrictive measures including fines for couples having more children than permitted.

== Background ==
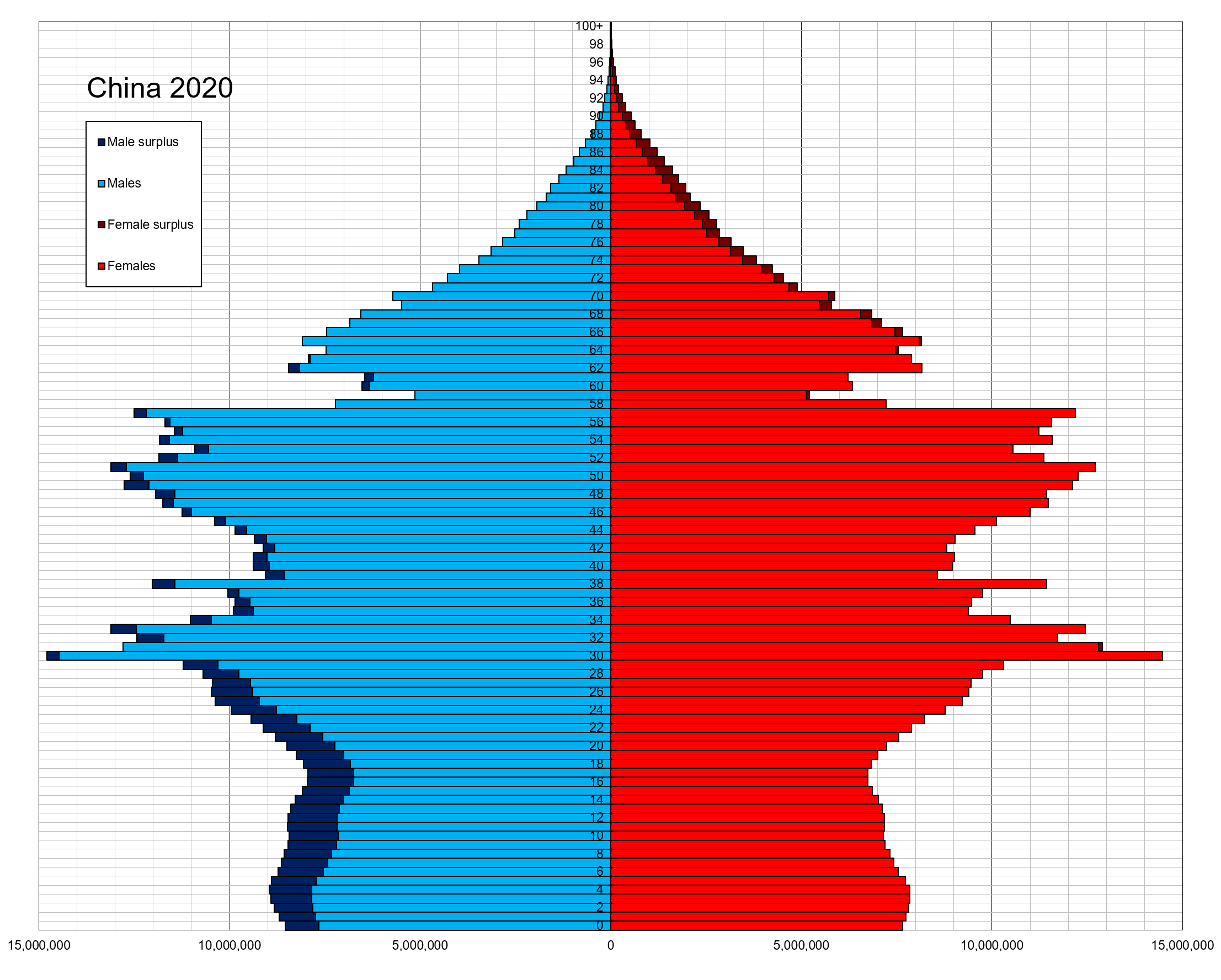
China single age population pyramid (2020)

Beginning in 1979, China implemented the one-child policy, which stipulated that a couple could only have one child, resulting in a declining new population and a rapidly aging society. In order to slow down the trend of population aging, in 2015, the CCP officially launched the two-child policy, which relaxed the birth restrictions. However, the policy did not result in the expected wave of births, and the pregnancy rate among young women continued to decline, experiencing a third consecutive year of decrease. In this regard, during the 2020 National People's Congress (NPC) session, NPC deputy Huang Xihua suggested removing the penalty policy for having more than three children. Previously, the fine, called a "social upbringing fee" or "social maintenance fee," was the punishment for the families having more than one child. According to the policy, the families violating the law brought a burden to the whole society. Therefore, the social maintenance fee was used for the operation of local governments.

According to Reuters, as of late 2020, people were being fined 130,000 yuan (about US$18,800) for having a third child.

== Reactions ==
Although the CCP government had high expectations for the new policy, in a 2021 online poll conducted by the official state news agency Xinhua on its Weibo account, using the hashtag #AreYouReady for the new three-child policy, about 29,000 out of 31,000 respondents stated they would "never consider it."

Moody's, a bond credit rating agency, said the new three-child policy is unlikely to boost birthrate and the aging will remain a credit-negative constraint for China. A January 2022 study suggested allowing a third child would not significantly boost fertility in the short term.

In January 2023, the government of Sichuan Province announced that it had abolished the three-child policy completely, allowing parents in Sichuan to legally have as many children as they want.

According to a report released in October 2023 by China's National Health Commission, data shows that 15% of the 9.56 million newborns in 2022 were a family's third child, up only 0.5% from 2021.

== See also ==
- One-child policy
- Population history of China
- Tax on childlessness
- Two-child policy
- Aging of China
