= Ma Yinchu =

Chinese economist (1882–1982)

- 马寅初
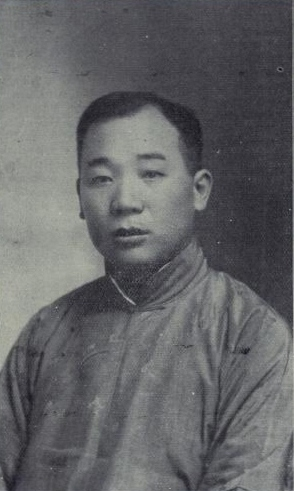
- Ma Yinchu

President of Peking University
- In office June 1951 – March 1960
- Preceded by: Tang Yongtong
- Succeeded by: Lu Ping

Personal details
- Born: June 24, 1882 Sheng County, Zhejiang, Qing China
- Died: May 10, 1982 (aged 99) Beijing, China
- Party: Chinese Communist Party
- Education: Tianjin University; Yale University; Columbia University

Academic work
- Discipline: Economics
- Institutions: Peking University

Ma Yinchu (simplified Chinese: 马寅初; traditional Chinese: 馬寅初; pinyin: Mǎ Yínchū; 1882–1982) was a prominent Chinese economist. He was the father of China's family planning.

== Biography ==
=== Early life ===
Ma Yinchu was born in Sheng County, Shaoxing, Zhejiang. He was the fifth child of the owner of a small distillery that specialized in fermented rice liquor. While his father wished for him to carry on this business, Ma showed an inclination toward scholarship. As a result, his father cut him off financially, and their relationship never recovered. His Christian uncle enlisted Ma into a Protestant church middle school in Shanghai. Despite losing his father's support, he studied mining and metallurgy at Beiyang University (now called Tianjin University). In 1907, Ma received government sponsorship to study economics at Yale University, after which he received a Ph.D. in economics and philosophy from Columbia University in 1914. At Columbia, Ma studied New York City's finances. His dissertation on New York City's public finance was later used in a textbook at Columbia.

=== Return to China ===
When he returned to China, Ma sought to promote Western ideas of fiscal policy and banking. In 1920 he helped to found the Shanghai College of Commerce, and in 1923 he became the founding president of the Chinese Economics Society. During the 1930s, Ma began to criticize the Kuomintang government under Chiang Kai-shek. He was imprisoned by the KMT government for supporting the student protest movement, spending time at the Xifeng concentration camp.

From 1945 to 1949, Ma lived in Hong Kong. In 1949, at the request of Zhou Enlai, he served as a nonpartisan delegate to the Chinese People's Political Consultative Conference. From 1950 to 1951, he served as the president of Zhejiang University, and then as the president of Peking University from 1951 to 1960. In this position, Ma was well liked, and seen as warm and genuine by his students. However, he was removed due to his unorthodox economic views.

=== New Population Theory ===
In June 1957, at the fourth session of the First National People's Congress, Ma presented his New Population Theory. Having examined trends of the early 1950s, he concluded that further population growth at such high rates would be detrimental to China's development. Therefore, he advocated government control of fertility. During the following three years, Ma's theory suffered two rounds of attacks, and he was dismissed from public life. The charges of the government were that the theory followed Malthusianism, attempted to discredit the superiority of socialism, and showed contempt for the people.

=== Rehabilitation and later life ===
Ma's New Population Theory did not receive mention in the People's Daily again until June 5, 1979. On July 26 of the same year, the Central Committee of the Chinese Communist Party formally apologized to him, stating that events had validated his theory. In September 1979, all charges against him were retracted, and he was made honorary president of Peking University. Ma Yinchu died on May 10, 1982, due to heart and lung disease and pneumonia.

== Legacy ==
Even before Ma's death, scholars were realizing the enormity of the government's error in censoring his views for two decades. This view can be demonstrated by the title of a newspaper article published in 1979: "Erroneously criticized one person, population mistakenly increased 300,000,000". Ma's theory also became enshrined in public policy; China's one-child policy drew heavily on Ma's reasoning that "the State should have the power to intervene in reproduction and to control population", and follows his advice in heavily utilizing propaganda on the dangers of population growth. In Ma's hometown, a middle school has been named in his honor. His birth home is being renovated as a museum, and the street on which it resides is now called "Famous Man Street". Nationally, the scholar is featured prominently in primary and middle school textbooks as "Uncle Ma", where he is praised for his contributions to population control and environmental protection. In 1997, a nine-part series about his life was aired in commemoration of the 40th anniversary of the publication of his population theory.

== See also ==
- Family planning policies of China

Educational offices
Preceded by Tang Yongtong	President of Peking University; 1951–1960	Succeeded by Lu Ping
