= Two-child policy =

Population-control policies in some countries and territories

A two-child policy is a government-imposed limit of two children allowed per family or the payment of government subsidies only to the first two children.

A two-child policy has previously been used in several countries including Iran, Singapore, and Vietnam. In British Hong Kong in the 1970s, citizens were also highly encouraged to have two children as a limit (although it was not mandated by law), and it was used as part of the region's family planning strategies. From 2016 to 2021, it had been implemented in China, replacing the country's previous one-child policy, until it was replaced by a three-child policy to mitigate the country's falling birth rates. In July 2021, all family size limits as well as penalties for exceeding them were removed as the aging population was growing.

== Africa ==
=== Egypt ===
As Egypt faces overpopulation and high densities, the city of Cairo initiated a family planning campaign known as "Two is Enough" in 2017 to encourage Egyptian families to have no more than two children. By April 2021 the program managed to refer 853,643 women to family planning clinics.

== Asia ==
=== East Asia ===
==== Hong Kong ====
In Hong Kong, the Eugenics League was founded in 1936, which became The Family Planning Association of Hong Kong in 1950. The organization provides family planning advice, sex education, and birth control services to the general public of Hong Kong. In the 1970s due to the rapidly rising population, it launched the "Two is Enough" campaign, which reduced the general birth rate through educational means. The organization founded the International Planned Parenthood Federation, with its counterparts in seven other countries. The total fertility rate in Hong Kong was 0.841 children per woman in 2024, one of the lowest in the world. Although the "Two is Enough" campaign found widespread approval, it does not reflect current government policy in supporting families. Tax allowances of 100,000 HK$ per child can be claimed for up to 9 children. Furthermore, parents who have fallen into hardship can apply for special assistance from the state. This is a means-tested financial benefit, which is not limited to a particular number of children either.

==== China ====
From 1979 until 2015, Chinese citizens were generally permitted to have only one child, with certain exceptions, for example minority ethnic women (Tibetan, Uyghur, etc.) were not subject to the one-child policy. The ongoing Cultural Revolution and the strain it placed on the nation were large factors. During this time, the birth rate dropped from nearly 6 children per woman to just under 3. (The colloquial term "births per woman" is usually formalized as the Total Fertility Rate (TFR), a technical term in demographic analysis meaning the average number of children that would be born to a woman over her lifetime if she were to experience the exact current age-specific fertility rates through her lifetime.) Previously, the fine is so-called "social maintenance fee" and it is the punishment for the families who have more than one child. According to the policy, the families who violate the law may bring the burden to the whole society. Therefore, the social maintenance fee will be used for the operation of the basic government.

As China's youngest generation (born under the one-child policy, which first became a requirement for most couples in 1979) came of age for formation of the next generation, a single child would be left with having to provide support for their two parents and four grandparents. In response to this issue, by 2009 all provinces allowed couples to have two children if both parents were the only children of their parents themselves. After a policy change of the Chinese government in late 2013, most Chinese provinces further relaxed the policy in 2014 by allowing families to have two children if one of the parents is an only child.

Han Chinese living in rural areas were often permitted to have two children, as exceptions existed if the first child was a daughter. Because of cases such as these, as well as urban couples who simply paid a fine (or "social maintenance fee") to have more children, the overall fertility rate of mainland China is, in fact, closer to two children per family than to one child per family (1.8). In addition, since 2012, Han Chinese in southern Xinjiang were allowed to have two children. This, along with incentives and restrictions against higher Muslim Uyghur fertility, was seen as attempt to counter the threat of Uyghur separatism.

On 29 October 2015, Xinhua reported the change in the existing law to a two-child policy citing a statement from the Chinese Communist Party. The new policy allowing Chinese couples to have two children was proposed to help address the ageing issue in China. On 27 December 2015, the new law was passed in the session of the National People's Congress Standing Committee, which governs country's laws, effective from 1 January 2016.

In 2018, about two years after the new policy reform, China is facing new ramifications from the two-child policy. Since the revision of the one-child policy, 90 million women have become eligible to have a second child. According to The Economist, the new two-child policy may have negative implications on gender roles, with new expectations for women to bear more children and to abandon their careers.

After the reform, China saw a short-lived boost in fertility rate for 2016. Chinese women gave birth to 17.9 million babies in 2016 (a record amount in the 21st century), but the number of births declined by 3.5% to 17.2 million in 2017, and to 15.2 million in 2018.

In China, men have greater marital power, which increases fertility pressure on their female partners. The dynamic of relationships (amount of "power" held by each parent), and the amount of resources each parent has contributes to the struggle for dominance. Resources would be items such as income, and health insurance. Dominance would be described as who has the final say in pregnancy, who must resign in their career for maternal/parental leave. However, women have shown interest in a second child if the first child did not possess the desired gender.

Chinese couples were also polled and stated that they would rather invest in one child opposed to two children. To add, another concern for couples would be the excessive costs of raising another child; China's childcare system needs to be further developed. The change in cultural norms appears to be having negative consequences and leads to fear of a large aging population with smaller younger generations; thus the lack of workforce to drive the economy.

In May 2018, it was reported that Chinese authorities were in the process of ending their population control policies. In May 2021, the Chinese government announced it would scrap the two-child policy in favour of a three-child policy, allowing couples to have three children to mitigate the country's falling birth rates.

=== Middle East ===
==== Iran ====
Iran authorities encouraged families in Iran not to have more than two children when conducting family planning in Iran from the early 1990s to late 2006. Iran's government "declared that Islam favoured families with only two children", as one historian put it. When the family planning program was initiated, Iran's Health Ministry launched a nationwide campaign and introduced contraceptives - pills, condoms, IUDs, implants, tubal ligations, and more. Starting in 2006, the government's population control policy changed when Ahmadinejad called for reversal of Iran's existing policy of "two children is enough" and later in 2012 Ali Khamenei also stated that Iran's contraceptive policy made sense 20 years ago, "but its continuation in later years was wrong ... Scientific and experts studies show that we will face population aging and reduction (in population) if the birth-control policy continues."

=== Southeast Asia ===
==== Myanmar ====
In Myanmar, Rohingya people have been subjected to two-child policies. Aung San Suu Kyi, the UN and Human Rights Watch described the policy as a human rights violation in 2013.

==== Singapore ====
In Singapore, the two-child policy until the 1980s was called "Stop at Two".

==== Vietnam ====
Vietnam has had a population policy for over 60 years. It was launched by the Vietnamese government in the early 1960s in North Vietnam and continued in a modified form throughout all of Vietnam (not just the north), until 2025, when due to a sub-replacement fertility rate, the communist government lifted all regulations regarding the number of children families are allowed to have. The two-child policy emphasized the official family-size goal to be một hoặc hai con, which means "one or two children."

In 1963, North Vietnam began a policy advocating a two-child norm due to the sharp population increase of the largely poor and rural population. Vietnam's family planning policy was developed before those of other countries, such as China. The government used a system of information, education, communication (IEC) campaign and publicly accessible contraceptives to curb the population. After the reunification of North and South Vietnam in 1975 under the Communist Party, there was a governmental effort to extend the policies of the North to the rest of Vietnam, which extended into the next decade.

After 1983, each family was required to limit the number of children to two. In 1985, the government increased incentives, such as contraceptives and abortion acceptors, and disincentives, such as penalties for violations in family planning.

In 1988, the Council of Ministers issued an in-depth family planning policy, adding additional restrictions beyond the previous restriction of keeping the maximum number of children per household to two. The detailed one-or-two-child policy of Vietnam was established nine years after China's one-child policy was implemented, and elements of China's policy are reflected in Vietnam's, such as the emphasis on marrying later, postponing childbearing age (22-years of age or older for women and 24-years of age or older for men), and spacing out birth of children (3–5 years apart). The state was required to supply free birth control devices (such as intrauterine loops, condoms, and birth control pills) and to provide facilities for individuals who are eligible for abortions. Furthermore, if families did not comply with the two-child policy, they were required to pay high fees and were unable to move into urban centers.

In 1993, the Vietnamese government issued the first formalization for the unified Vietnam of the one-to-two child policy as a mandatory national policy. The policy combined advertisements and education to promote a smaller family "so people may enjoy a plentiful and happy life." The goal of the policy was to reduce the Vietnamese fertility rate to the replacement level of 2.1 by 2015, so that the country could have a stable population in the mid-21st century. In 1997, the goal was accelerated to reach the replacement level by 2005, and the government subsequently integrated an increased use of abortion as a means to curb population growth.

The total fertility rate in Vietnam dropped from 5.6 in 1979 to 3.2 by 1993, suggesting the two-child policy was successful in containing the population growth.

Another study, published in the Worldwide State of the Family in 1995 by Tran Xuan Nhi, found a contrasting finding that the total fertility rate only dropped slightly and the size of nuclear families experienced only a slight change, dipping from 4.8 to 4.7 from 1989 to 1994.

On 4 June 2025, due to a below replacement birth rate, the government lifted all regulations regarding the number of children families are allowed to have Under the revised law, families are afforded the freedom to decide how many children they would like to have, childbirth timing, and spacing between births.

== Europe ==
=== United Kingdom ===
In October 2012, the Conservative-Liberal Democrat coalition government's proposed policy of only paying child benefit for the first two children of unemployed parents was described as a 'two-child policy', and was fronted by the Secretary of State for Work and Pensions and former leader of the Conservative Party Iain Duncan Smith.

In April 2015, David Cameron denied any such plans to cut child benefits or tax credits. However, three months later, George Osborne, the then Chancellor, announced that child tax credits would be limited to the first two children only. This was to come into force from the 2017/2018 financial year and apply to children born after that date only.

The two-child policy took effect on 5 April 2017. One aspect of the new rules, termed the "rape clause" has caused controversy. Although the policy excludes all but the first two children from all available benefits, an exemption can be applied for if the conception of the third and any further children occurred as a result of the rape of the claimant. A woman wishing to claim this exemption must fill in an eight-page form:

"The form requires women wanting to be eligible for the exemption to sign a declaration saying they were raped or otherwise coerced into sex – and giving the child's name. They must sign a declaration reading: 'I believe the non-consensual conception exemption applies to my child.' They must also sign another declaration that says: 'I confirm that I am not living with the other parent of this child.'"

That women must thereby identify the child in question (which is thought to be assigned a tax code created for this exemption), that first or second children conceived by rape do not count towards this exemption and that women who are still living with their abusers are not eligible are just some of the aspects of the rape clause that caused widespread condemnation. Ruth Graham, writing for Slate, summarises the issues surrounding this new policy:

"The policy and the exemption have received harsh criticism from a wide variety of sources since they were announced in 2015. One member of parliament called the exemption implementation 'inhumane and barbaric.' Feminists have pointed out the cuts disproportionately affect women. A coalition of the UK's largest Christian denominations and Jewish groups pointed out that the policy discriminates against people whose religion compels them to have larger families. A United Nations committee on children's rights asked the British government to explain the policy last year, because of concerns about women having to somehow prove they were raped."

Following the Labour Party's victory in the 2024 general election, Keir Starmer received calls to scrap the policy but declined as a result of financial reasons, and suspended seven Labour MPs who voted in favour of scrapping it.

On 26 November 2025, the Chancellor of the Exchequer Rachel Reeves announced in the November budget that from April 2026, the two child benefit cap would be lifted. Martin Lewis of MoneySavingExpert reported that this would bring 450,000 children out of poverty.

== See also ==
- Family planning
  - Family planning in India – Authorities in India unsuccessfully attempted to implement a two-child policy
- One-child policy
- Only child
- Pledge two or fewer (family limitation campaign)
- Population Control Bill, 2019
- Population history of China
- Shadow Children, a young adult science fiction series about a society with a two-child policy
- Tax on childlessness
- Three-child policy
- Human population planning
