= Marriage in modern China =

Modern marriage practices

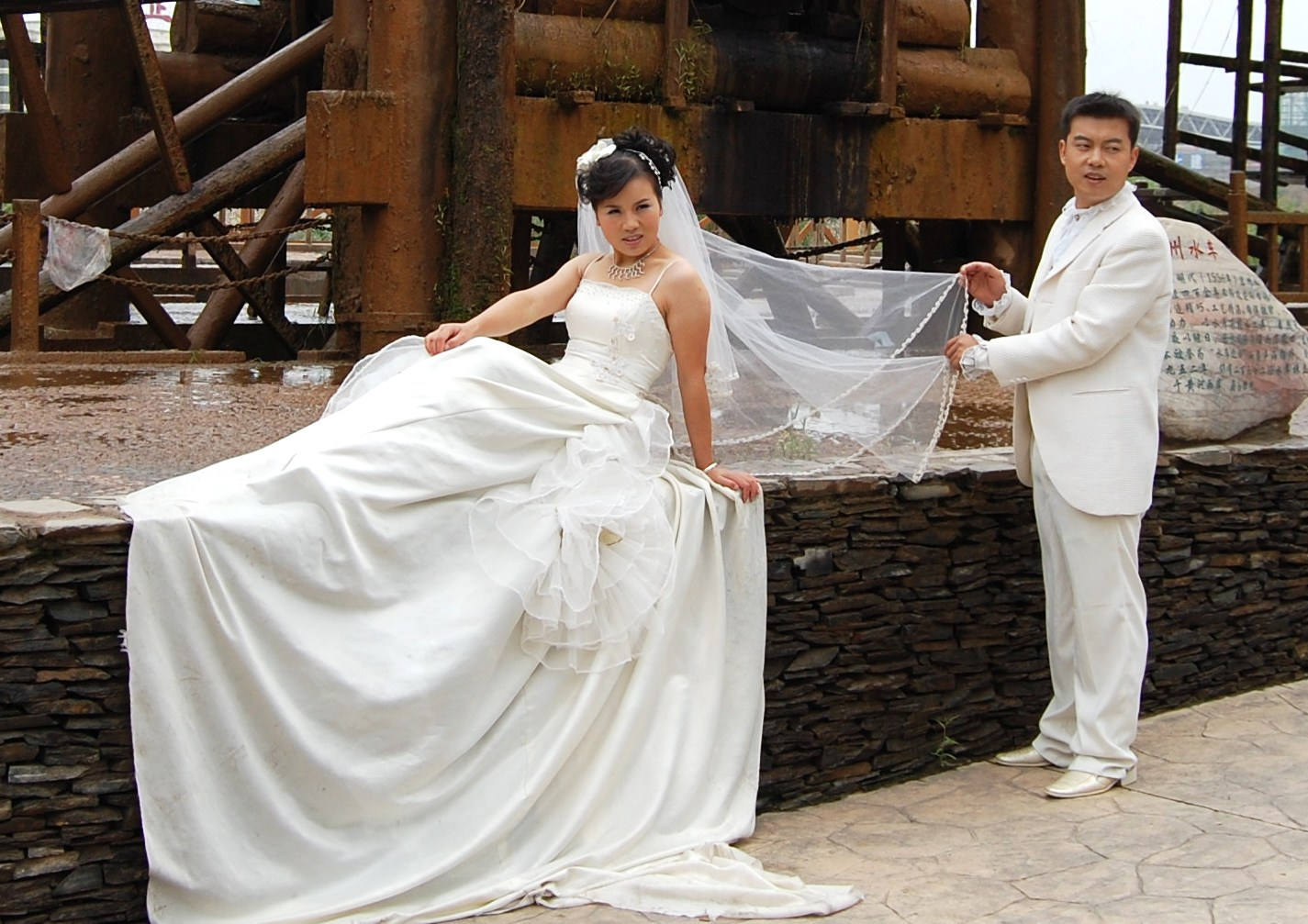
Attitudes about marriage have been influenced by Western countries, with more couples nowadays opting for western style weddings

Marriage in the People's Republic of China has undergone change during the reform and opening up period, especially as a result of new legal policies such as the New Marriage Law of 1950 and the family planning policy in place from 1979 to 2015. The major transformation in the twentieth century is characterized by the change from traditional structures for traditional Chinese marriage, such as arranged marriage, to one where the freedom to choose one’s partner is generally respected. However, both parental and cultural pressures are still placed on many individuals, especially women, to choose socially and economically advantageous marriage partners. In 2010, 1.96 million couples applied for divorce, representing a rate 14% higher than the previous year, and twice as high as ten years before. In 2024, China was on track to record fewer marriages since records began in 1980. After a rebound in 2025, marriage registrations fell to an 18-year low in 2026.

== Background ==
Traditionally, marriage life was based on the principles of the Confucian ideology. This ideology formed a culture of marriage that strove for the “Chinese family idea, which was to have many generations under one roof". Confucianism grants order and hierarchy as well as the collective needs over those of the individual. It was the maintenance of filial piety that dictated a traditional behavior code between men and women in marriage and in the lifetime preparation for marriage. The segregation of females and the education of males were cultural practices that separated the two sexes, as men and women would occupy different spheres after marriage.

“Marriage was under the near-absolute control of family elders and was considered an important part of a family's strategy for success”. The system of patrilineal succession and ancestral worship left no place for daughters within their natal family trees. Traditionally, brides became a part of their husband’s family and essentially cut ties with their natal families with special emphasis placed on a wife’s ability to produce a male heir. As arranged marriages were customary, husband and wife often did not meet each other until the day of the wedding. Married life consisted of a complex and rigid family arrangement with the role of the male to provide for the family and that of the female to care of the domestic duties within the home, as dictated by the ideas conveyed in Song Ruozhao’s Analects for Women. Although Confucianism is no longer thought of an explicit belief system in China, it has created a lasting legacy of traditional assumptions and ideas about marriage. Thus, it is still a major barrier to achieving gender equality and women’s sexual autonomy in marriage. On the other hand, the higher house prices squeeze the marriage in China. The house price plays an important role on the influence of marriage and fertility. The increasing house price leads to the lower marriage rate and cause the other serious social problems in China. For the rapid reduction of marriage and fertility, the center government should establish the policy to deal with the high house price.

Although these are common Han practices, many minority groups in China practice different marriage and family lineage practices. For example, the small ethnic minority of the Mosuo practice matrilineal succession, and for the entire process from pregnancy, childbirth, to raising a family, the wife-husband pair work together and there is little gendered division of labor in the practices of the Lahu people.

In the 1950s, the political campaign for "Five-Good Families" urged families to practice the principles of (1) "harmony between husbands and wives"; (2) "equality between men and women"; (3) "frugality in housekeeping"; (4) "solidarity among neighbors"; and (5) "honoring elders and caring for the young."

== Marriage laws ==
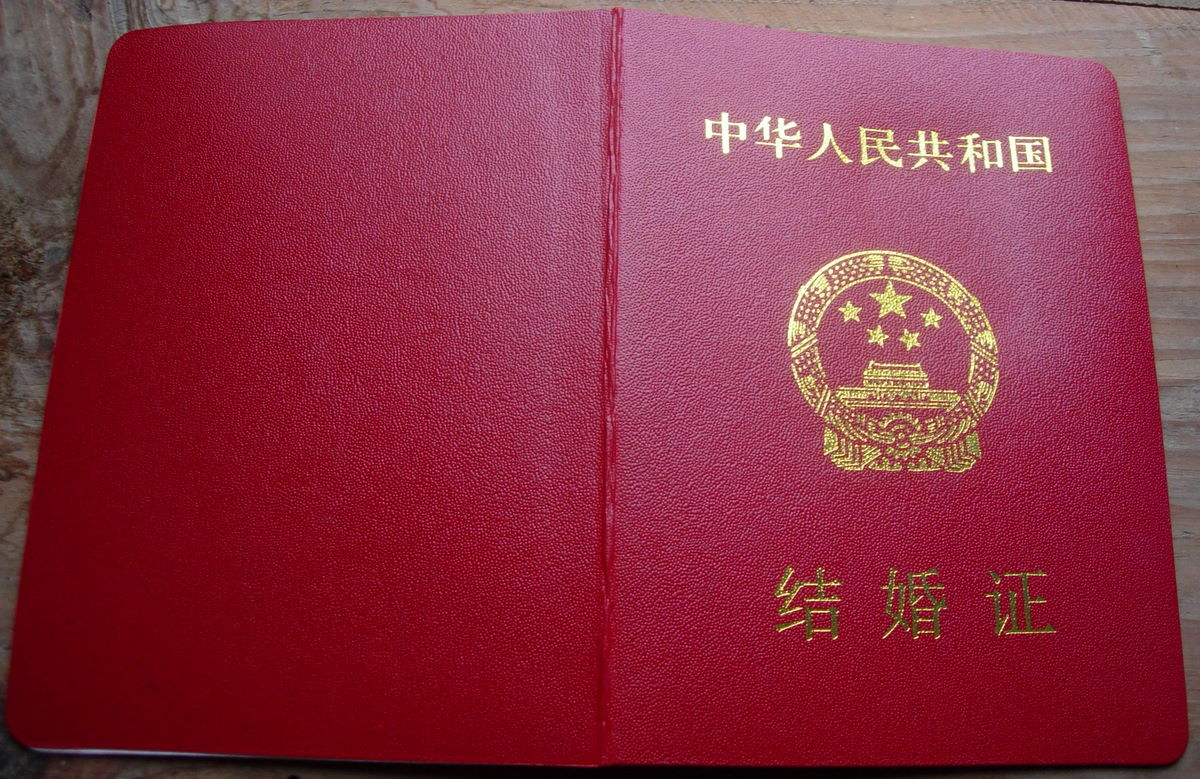
The face of a marriage certificate issued in 2004

In Nationalist China, a man could only have one official wife, but polygamy remained in wealthier households where a man might have an official wife (termed, big wife) and a concubine with lower status than the big wife (termed, small wife).

The minimum age for marriage in the Republic of China was 16 for women and 18 for men.

Soon after its founding, the People's Republic of China passed the Marriage Law of 1950. It prohibited concubinage and marriages when one party was sexually powerless, suffered from a venereal disease, leprosy, or a mental disorder. The law abolished arranged marriages, paying money or goods for a wife, and outlawed polygamy and child marriage. It raised the minimum age to marry to 18 for women and 20 for men. Following the passage of the 1950 Marriage Law, mass campaigns promoted the principle of freely-chosen monogamous marriages and official registration of marriage.

On September 10, 1980, the Marriage Law of the People’s Republic of China was adopted as the modified law code from the 1950 Marriage Law. The 1950 Marriage Law was the first legal document under the People's Republic of China to address marriage and family law. The 1980 Marriage Law followed the same format of the 1950 law, but it was amended in 2001 to introduce and synthesize a national code of family planning. This Marriage Law abolished the feudal marriage system, which included arranged marriage, male superiority, and the disregard for the interests of children. This law also guaranteed the right to divorce and the free-choice marriage.

The law was revised by a group that included the All-China Women’s Federation, the Supreme People’s Court, and the Supreme People’s Procuratorate, among others. The changes introduced in the 1980 Marriage Law represent the principle transition of the traditional structure of marriage to a modern legal framework. The law enforces provisions to value that gender equality and family relations are emphasized in the reform, and is divided into four major subsections: general principles, marriage contract, family relations, and divorce.

=== General principles of marriage ===
The 1980 Marriage Law stipulates that marriage is based on the freedom to choose one’s partner, the practice of monogamy, and equality of the sexes. Article 3 of the law emphasizes the freedom to choose one’s spouse by forbidding marriage decisions made by third parties and the use of money or gifts involved into the arrangement of a marriage. The law also prohibits maltreatment and desertion of family members.

The 1980 law also states that marriage must be a willing action where coercion by a third party is strictly not permitted. The age requirement for marriage is 22 years of age for men and 20 years of age for women and the 1980 law also encouraged late marriage and later child birth. This provision in the law shows a change from the 1950 law which set the age requirements at 18 and 20 for women and men respectively, showing state support of marriage at a later age.

The law bans marriage between close relatives, which is defined as lineal relatives, blood relative in the direct line of descent, and collateral relatives, such as cousins or uncles, to the third degree of relationship. Furthermore, after a marriage has been registered and a certificate for marriage is obtained, the newlyweds can freely choose to become a member of each other’s families if they so desire, meaning they are not obligated to choose one family and abandon the other as was tradition for Chinese women.

Anthropologists often identify the 1980 Marriage Law as an important turning point in the gradual shift of marriage to increasingly focus on affective ties and frameworks of romantic love.

The 1980 Marriage Law described birth planning as a national duty.

The 1980 law decriminalizes concubinage, which was strictly banned back in 1950; some lawyers believe that the sugar-baby activities or concubinage started to flourish again since early 1980s.

The 2001 Amendment of Marriage Law Article 3 bans the cohabitation between a married person with another opposite sex, again.

=== Family relations ===
This section of the marriage law states that men and women are of equal status in the home and each have a right to use their own family name if they choose. Both also have the freedom to work, to engage in society, and to pursue an education where neither is allowed to restrict the other from pursuing these choices. The Law emphasizes marriage planning between the couple as well. Mistreatment of children, including infanticide or any serious harm to infants is prohibited. Property gained during a marriage belongs to both husband and wife and both have equal rights to such property. Familial relationships include the duty to support and assist each other; parents to provide for their children; and grown children have the obligation to care for their parents. This provision “[stresses] the obligation of children to care for aging parents.” Women now are not required to be obedient to or to serve their in-laws anymore, and married couples are able to have more intimate relationships.

Children are given the freedom to choose either parent’s last name and have the right to demand the proper care from their parents. Children born out of wedlock have the same rights as children born to a married couple and the father has the duty to provide for that child. Adoption is legal and the same rights apply between adopted children and parents as with biological children.

Rights between adopted children and birth parents become null after the child has been adopted. Stepchildren should not be mistreated and have the right to the same relations between parents and children. Grandparents have the duty to care for grandchildren whose parents are deceased and grandchildren have the duty to care for grandparents whose children are deceased. Older siblings who are able to care for younger siblings that are orphaned have the duty to provide for their siblings.

=== Divorce ===
Divorce can be granted when both husband and wife desire it. Both should apply for a divorce and make arrangements for children and property so a divorce certificate can be issued. Divorces initiated by one party should be taken to the people’s court and will be granted when reconciliation is not possible. This law also specifies that divorce does not cut parental ties and that those relationships should be maintained.

The 2020 Minfadian (civil code) introduced a 30-day "cool-off period" for uncontested divorces, which are handled by the Civil Affairs Bureau. This rule does not affect contested divorces handled by the court. However, the judicial system is known to habitually deny initial petitions. In one extreme case, Ning Shunhua v. Chen Dinghua, a Hunanese women took five petitions to divorce her gambling husband.

== Divorce laws ==
Divorce laws in China have undergone significant changes throughout history, reflecting the evolution of Chinese societal and cultural norms. Divorce in China has existed for at least two thousand years, yet the right to divorce was mainly available to men. Historically, there were seven grounds for a man to repudiate his wife including adultery, infertility, and disobedience to his parents. Women, on the other hand, only had three grounds to prevent such repudiation. In the most extreme cases, a woman could only escape a marriage by running away or committing suicide.

=== Imperial era ===
During the imperial era, divorce laws became more codified and restrictive. The Qing government implemented strict rules governing divorce. For instance, a couple would need a valid reason to divorce, such as infidelity, and the couple would need to obtain approval from their families and the government. A man might divorce his wife under the Qing legal code for improper behavior (gossip, jealousy, adultery, theft, lack of filiality toward in-laws), sickness, or inability to bear a son. These rights were not shared by the wife who could only divorce her husband if her birth family was willing to file a lawsuit on her behalf, and then only if her husband had abandoned her, caused her lasting bodily damage, sought to sell her, or forced her to commit adultery. In practice, divorce was extremely rare in the late Qing Dynasty and could result in social ostracism.

=== Republican period ===
During the Republican Period, there was a shift towards more liberal divorce laws. In 1930, the government passed the family law which abolished the requirement for family approval and granted a unilateral divorce on ten grounds. However, divorce was still relatively rare due to the continued social stigma attached to it.

While the new law provided better protection for concubines by treating them as family members, it became less socially acceptable for a man to have one. Under the new code, taking on a concubine was effectively considered adultery. As a result, the wife could seek a divorce if her husband took a concubine after the Civil Code was implemented in May 1931, but not if he had one before that date. Although a wife couldn't force her husband to abandon his concubine, she could opt for a judicial separation instead of a divorce. This way, she wouldn't have to live with him and wouldn't face the social stigma associated with being a divorcée.

When the Japanese army invaded China, divorce suits increased in cities that fell under Japanese control. Many men vanished and left their families without financial support. In 1942, women in Beijing filed 77 percent of all divorce cases, with over half of these cases citing desertion as the reason. In court, women shared stories of husbands who left home to find work but either went missing or were unable to send money back, resulting in wives struggling to provide for themselves and their children. Wives of Nationalist soldiers faced long separations from their husbands, who were unable to communicate or send remittances across Japanese lines. Even if they could, the low pay of enlisted men in the Nationalist army would have made it difficult. In such circumstances, courts were inclined to grant the wife a divorce.

=== PRC before 1981 ===
Upon the establishment of the People’s Republic of China in 1949, the Chinese Communist Party enacted the Marriage Law in 1950. This law allowed couples to divorce if they both agreed to it, but if they couldn't agree, they had to try mediation and ultimately go to court for a decision. Additionally, the law prohibited husbands from divorcing their wives while they were pregnant or recently were pregnant, and it required a soldier's spouse to have the soldier's permission to obtain a divorce. The primary objective of the Marriage Law of 1950 was to abolish the feudalistic marriage system that persisted in China before 1949. Another development around 1950 was the land reform which granted women the right to own land, enabling them to achieve some more financial autonomy. These changes regarding divorce and land ownership led more women to seek divorce. As a result, the marriage law became known as the "divorce law." since divorce emerged as the most contentious and alarming aspect of the newly introduced laws. Statistics show an exponential increase in divorce cases after the Marriage Law came into effect. In 21 large and medium-sized cities, there were 9,300 divorce petitions from January through April 1950. In that same year, there were 17,763 divorce petitions from May through August.

While the Marriage Law was welcomed by many urban women, it was strongly resisted by rural Chinese families. They saw the dissolution of marriage as a consequence of this law and, along with the government, began to oppose this law. During the Cultural Revolution, divorce rates in China dropped significantly, primarily because the courts were highly restrictive in granting divorces. One of the few reasons courts would allow divorce was to separate a persecuted person from their family. This means that if a person was deemed to be a political target, a "counter-revolutionary," or faced persecution for any other reason related to the Cultural Revolution, the courts would permit a divorce to distance that person from their spouse and children. The intent behind such divorces was to protect the family from guilt by association, as the persecution of one family member could lead to severe consequences for the entire family.

=== After 1981 Marriage Law ===
The Marriage Law of 1981 promoted the lawful process of obtaining a divorce. This law added a new criterion for divorce: alienation of affection. During the Maoist era, divorce petitions often led to lengthy mediation processes and even official pressure for couples to stay together. However, under the new law, if mediation was unsuccessful, courts were instructed to grant a divorce. In addition, this law specifies three forms of divorce in present-day China:

1. Divorce by mutual agreement. This type of divorce is managed by civil affairs departments instead of the courts and doesn't involve any fees for the applicants. In this case, an approved divorce means the marriage certificate was withdrawn and a divorce certificate issued.
2. Divorce by court mediation. This type of divorce can result in two outcomes. If the mediation is successful in resolving the conflict between the couple, the divorce application is withdrawn. On the other hand, if the mediation fails, the court will issue a mediated divorce certificate, which holds the same legal value as a verdict.
3. Divorce by appeal to the People’s Court. This type of divorce happens if one party desires a divorce but the other does not agree. If the court determines that the couple has lost their love for each other and that their relationship is irreparable, a court verdict will grant them a divorce to entirely dissolve the marriage.

In theory, the Marriage Law of 1981 is capable of making divorce easier in cases where only one party seeks divorce. However, due to cultural norms, divorce is largely seen as the last resort, and couples filing for divorce are discouraged by several parties before their case reaches the civil affairs department. In urban areas, the work unit, the residents' committee, and the neighborhood cadres all step in to help the couple reunite. In rural areas, the divorce mediation process tended to disadvantage the female petitioner. Mediators often consist of members from the husband's family and would either blame the wife or persuade her to remain in the marriage. Official statistics show that in 1982, about 25 percent of all would-be divorces were reconciled after mediation in court, reflecting the government's view that "earnest mediation can prevent the disintegration of families."

In the 21st century, divorce rates in China have steadily increased, especially in urban areas. Among all divorce cases, 70 percent of initiators are women. This is partially due to China’s economic growth. More women are being educated and the societal stigma around divorce is becoming less severe. Another reason for more divorces is that in 2001, amendments to the Marriage Law included post-divorce reliefs such as economic compensation for divorce damages.

The divorce law of 2003 removed the requirement of a pre-divorce mediation.

=== The "cooling-off" period ===
Divorce in China have come under increasing restrictions in the 2020s. Fearing a potential population drop, the government has responded to the increasing trend of divorce by implementing new divorce policies to achieve social stability. In 2021, the government added a new provision to the Civil Code Act 1077, which is later referred to as the mandatory “cooling-off” period. Couples who file for divorce are required to wait for a duration of 30 days after submitting their application. During this period, either spouse is allowed to retract their petition. After the completion of the stipulated 30-day waiting period, the couple must once again submit their divorce application in person to legally end their marriage. Chinese officials’ argument for this provision is to prevent “impulsive” divorces and to stop couples who try to escape home purchase limits through a fake divorce. Escaping home purchase limits refers to a practice where couples exploit loopholes in regulations by getting a fake divorce, allowing them to buy additional properties under each person's name. This tactic is used to bypass government-imposed restrictions on the number of properties an individual or a family can own. The “cooling-off” period is shown to be effective in reducing divorce rates, as the Ministry of Civil Affairs has reported that there were 296,000 recorded divorces in the first quarter of 2021. This figure is 72% lower than the 1.06 million divorces that were registered in the last quarter of the previous year.

In May 2020, right after the draft law was published, it became a focal point of social discourse, gaining attention across various domestic social media platforms, including Tik Tok, Sina Weibo, WeChat Moments, and Qzone. Chinese people voiced several arguments against the cooling-off period on these platforms. For example, they say the legislators initially "assumed" that people's intention to divorce was an irrational decision, an assumption that many considered self-righteous and paternalistic overreach. After all, in highly personal relationships like marriage, the individuals involved hold the exclusive right to judge whether the relationship is good or bad.

Many Chinese couples rushed to divorce right before the “cooling-off” period came into effect at the end of 2020. Some people fear that the cooling-off period will make it harder for the initiator of the divorce, mostly women, who have historically been the vulnerable party in the marriage. Others point to the possibility that the cooling-off period makes women more vulnerable to domestic violence and even spousal murder. For instance, Kan Xiaofang had long suffered from domestic violence from her husband and filed for divorce in 2021. During the New Year's holiday, she went back to her original residence to gather essential items and continue with the divorce process. Her sister reported that when they noticed an ax near the entrance of her old house, Kan made a remark stating that her husband might be planning to kill her. On January 8, Kan Xiaofang was brutally killed by her spouse before the divorce lawsuit was over. This case has triggered a new round of public discussion about the "cooling-off period" for divorce. People argue that making the divorce process more complex and time-consuming without providing comprehensive protection to women who suffer from domestic violence could lead to tragic consequences.

According to an Indiana University study, 80 percent of divorce petitions filed by women were denied on the first try, even with evidence of domestic violence present.

== Marriage reform ==
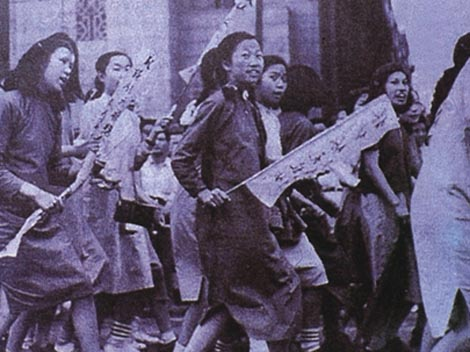
Female students in China participate in a demonstration as part of the May Fourth Movement.

Marriage today has been influenced by many of the revolutionary and feminist movements that have occurred in the twentieth century. Such reforms focused on women and family. For example, the efforts to end foot binding, the movement to secure rights to education for women, and the campaigns to allow women into the work force, alongside other changes all challenged the traditional gender role of married women. However, in practice, women are still responsible for the majority of domestic work and are expected to put their husbands and families first. Working-class women are often forced to juggle the double burden of doing the majority of the household labor with the waged work they must do to support their families. In particular, the May Fourth movement called for men and women to interact freely in public, and to make marriage a free choice based on true love. This freedom of choosing one's spouse was codified in the 1950 Marriage Law, which also outlawed arranged and coerced marriages.

Important changes in marriage practices came from then newly established communist government which introduced new law in 1950 and 1980, include new Marriage Laws' outlawing of concubinage, child marriages, polygamy, and selling of sons and daughters into marriage or prostitution. Provisions made for changes in property ownership have also significantly altered the marital relationships between men and women. For example, women were allowed to own property under this law, as well as inherit it. Laws such as the one-child policy have influenced the family structures and fertility patterns of married couples as well.

The marriage laws also enforced an age restriction on marital union in an effort to encourage a later marrying age. The law however seemed to have the opposite effect as the law appeared to reduce the age at which couples got married. In 1978 the average age of marriage for women was 22.4 and 25.1 in rural and urban areas respectively, and after the 1980 Marriage Law it decreased to 21.0 years of age in the decade after the law was enacted. The mid twentieth century also saw changes in the occurrence of dowry and payments for brides as these no longer occurred as frequently. However, reports in recent years appear to indicate that these customs are still practiced in some areas, and may actually be increasing since the government has relaxed its tight prohibitions on the practices.

In January 2017, authorities in Kaili City, in the Guizhou province issued new rules banning wedding banquets for people who are marrying for the second time in an attempt to subdue public displays of extravagance. Multiple feasts, and the use of more than one location for one marriage have also been banned. A bride and groom must now register with their local government office if they wish to hold a wedding banquet to ensure that neither are registered as having been married before.

In December 2018 China’s ministry of civil affairs decreed at a conference on wedding reform that instead of an opulent event, weddings must "integrate core socialist values and excellent Chinese traditional culture into the construction of marriage and family", and "implement Xi Jinping’s important thoughts on socialism with Chinese characteristics in the new era, especially on the construction of marriage and family". In February 2026, the Cyberspace Administration of China mandated that social media platforms censor content deemed as spreading "fear of marriage."

== Same-sex marriage ==
Today there is no recognition of same-sex unions in China. Same-sex relationships have been a part of China’s long history, but it is in the modern period where “cultural tolerance of same-sex eroticism began to fade.” In the modernization efforts after 1949 sexuality was removed from the movement until specific policies were enacted in 1956. Acts of homosexuality were outlawed and classified as “hooliganism” and punished under criminal law.

In 1984 the state no longer punished homosexuality as a crime, but classified homosexuality as a mental illness. However, homosexuality is no longer classified as a mental disorder. Being a homosexual person bears even greater stigma than being single or divorced. Despite this stigma, many local lala communities have developed within China that have increased the visibility of non-normative sexualities and genders. However, the heterosexual family and marriage still serve as public forms of social control that pressure many of these women to participate in heterosexual marriages. As a result, several mobile apps and social media networks have developed in recent years to help homosexual individuals find a member of the opposite sex to marry, while continuing to date people of the same sex.

== Parental involvement ==
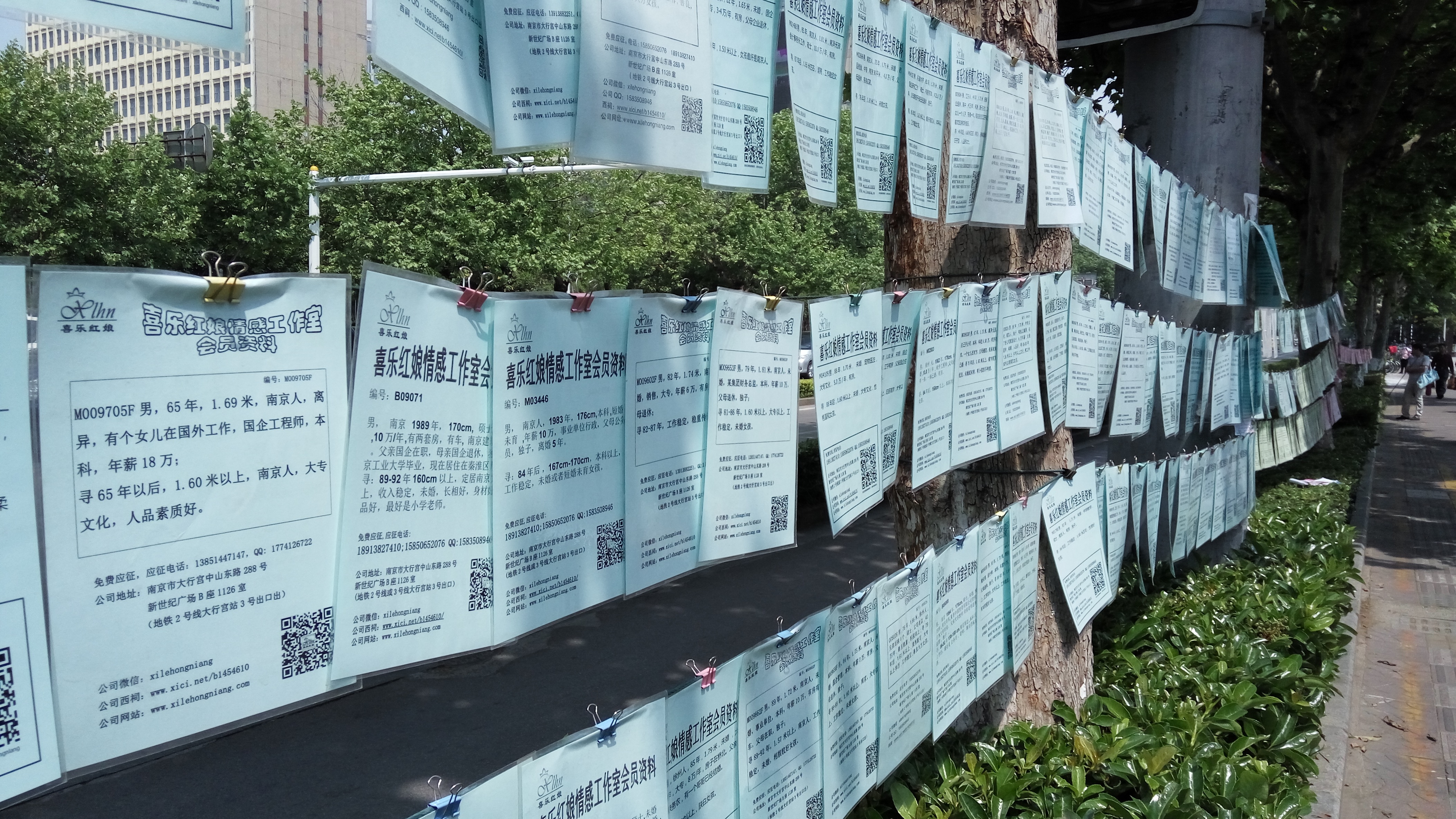
Advertisements detailing the age, assets, and education attainment of singles in the Chinese city of Nanjing, usually placed by their parents seeking to matchmake them without their knowledge.

The marriage decisions in pre-modern China traditionally were made by parents with the help of matchmakers, and the fate of the children were determined at an early age. Since the reforms in the twentieth century, and the implementation of the marriage law, such practices have been outlawed. Legally the decision to marry lies in the freedom of choice of a man or woman to choose their partners. During the 1930s and 1940s, most marriages were decided by the parents of those who were to be wed. Although parents or older generations decided everything for them, on who should be their mate and the amount of money spent on the wedding.

=== Arranged marriages ===
Research has shown that the enforcement of the law has not necessarily been able to stop the practice of parents arranging marriages completely, but a change in the practice is evident. In the last fifty years, data indicates that parental involvement in marriage decisions has decreased in all areas of China and among the majority of the population.

Total control in the marriage decisions of children by parents is rare in China today, but parental involvement in decision making now takes on a different form. Parental involvement can range from introducing potential spouses to giving advice on marriage decisions. As the family is an important institution in Chinese culture, parents may no longer hold absolute control but continue to be influential in the decisions of their children’s marriages. Marriage decisions are important to parents because families are understood not simply in the present but as lineages existing throughout time in which living generations pay tribute to ancestors. Additionally, women are generally expected to marry men who are economically better off than themselves in a practice called hypergamy. Thus, marriage can be beneficial for the entire family.

=== Living with married children ===
Outside of marriage decisions, parents may also be involved in the married lives of their children through their living arrangements. Although many couples now have their own separate residence, residential patterns of parents and children vary according to different circumstances. The occurrence of parents and their married children living together changes over the course of their lifetime as circumstances like childcare needs for the married couples arise, or when parents become widowed, and/or consideration of the health of parents.

== Types of marriage practices ==
=== Naked marriage ===
Naked marriage (裸婚, luǒhūn) is recent Chinese slang, coined in 2008 to describe the growing number of marriages between partners who do not yet own any significant assets. The "Five Nos" involved are: no ring, no ceremony, no honeymoon, no home, and no car. The practice violates traditions that a groom should provide a new place for his future wife or, at least, that the couple's families should provide them a material foundation to provide for their future grandchildren. However, in order for the marriage to be legally recognized and protected by law and the government, the marriage must be registered with the government in accordance with the marriage law. The practice also saves the groom's family from an expensive wedding, the average cost of which has been reckoned to have increased 4000 times in the last 30 years.

=== Flash marriage ===
Flash or blitz marriage (Chinese: 闪婚, shǎnhūn) is recent (and pejorative) Chinese slang for a marriage between partners who have known each other less than one month. In some cases, these young couples (usually in China's large cities) represent changing attitudes towards romantic love; in others, they have found the soaring prices of real estate have made such speedy marriages more economical. "Flash" marriages are also more likely to happen due to some couples being pressured by parents to marry quickly. However "flash" marriages are more likely to end in divorce soon afterwards as the couples find themselves unable to cope with each other due to personal habits that they did not know about before they married each other.

=== Shèngnǚ ("leftover women") ===
In recent years, the concept of Shèngnǚ or "leftover women" (剩女) has been created by the state media and government in order to pressure women into marrying earlier. State media often have articles about women regretting their decision not to marry early, highlighting the consequences of marrying at a later age. These “leftover women” are stigmatized as being abnormal and unfeminine, since remaining single represents a failure to adhere to the traditional role of women as wives despite their successes in the workplace.

Currently in China, there are more men than women, and women in every age group are more likely to marry than their male counterparts. Therefore, this will affect the long-term population growth in China as well as the number of working age population available in China, which is why the government believes that it is necessary to persuade women into marrying earlier.

Since the opening and reform period in the 1980s, increasing numbers of women hold college degrees and are now reluctant to be "tied down" to a married life so soon after their graduation, with women choosing to be more career-oriented. Another dynamic is reverse hypergamy, where men preferably choose to marry women who are younger than them, earn comparably less than their counterpart and come from a "lesser" background compared to the man himself.

The media conception of "leftover women" has instilled new anxieties into parents, especially those of college-educated daughters who have delayed marriage past their twenties. Thus, many parents have been driven to search for potential matches for their children, and matchmaking corners have emerged in most of the large cities in China. Most of the matchmaking candidates in these corners are females, which perpetuates the idea that there are more suitable men than women with which to form marriage partnerships. These women feel the conflicting desires to satisfy their parents and to experience autonomic, romantic love. They also express the desire to change the gender norms of their social realities by combating the career women's "double-burden." Thus, although arranged marriage is against official state policy, parents are still finding ways to exert influence and pressure on their children to form marriages that are beneficial for the family.

== Cui Hun ==
Cui Hun (催婚) is a common phenomenon in China that parents and relatives pressure unmarried people to marry before they're 30, particularly females. In China, most parents hope their children can marry at an earlier age, around 30 years old or earlier. Usually, parents will introduce them to potential people to date when parents feel anxiety and worry about their children's unmarried status. One of the most popular ways is by asking their relatives and friends to find a proper marriage partner. Also, they will go to matchmaking corners and post marriage-seeking ads. The phenomenon connects to the ideology that females' marriage and relationship status undermine their success. Caring for the Next Generation Working Committee, a Communist Party-affiliated organization established by the State Council, surveyed in 2016 that 86% of people whose ages range from 25 to 35 were pressured by their parents to marry.

There is a difference of values between two generations when it comes to whom and when they marry. Firstly, many older generations consider the ideal age to marry to be 23 for women and 25 for men. In particular, females are expected to marry before their late twenties, or they would be titled "Sheng Nu", in other words, "leftover women." However, as many young women pursue education and career, the average age of first marriage is delayed. For example, in 2005, people's average age of the first marriage is 24.37 for women and 26.68 for men in Shanghai. However, it becomes 28.14 for women and 30.11 for men in 2014. According to a 2021 report by the Communist Youth League, 44% of urban young women have no intention to marry.

== See also ==
- Chinese marriage
- Ghost marriage (Chinese)
- Walking marriage
- Shim-pua marriage
- Heqin
- May Fourth Movement
- New Marriage Law
- Back-up partner
- Sheng nu
- Mosuo
- Shanghai Lalas
- Recognition of same-sex unions in China
- Arranged Marriage
