= Tuanshan =

Traditional Chinese rigid fan, typically circular

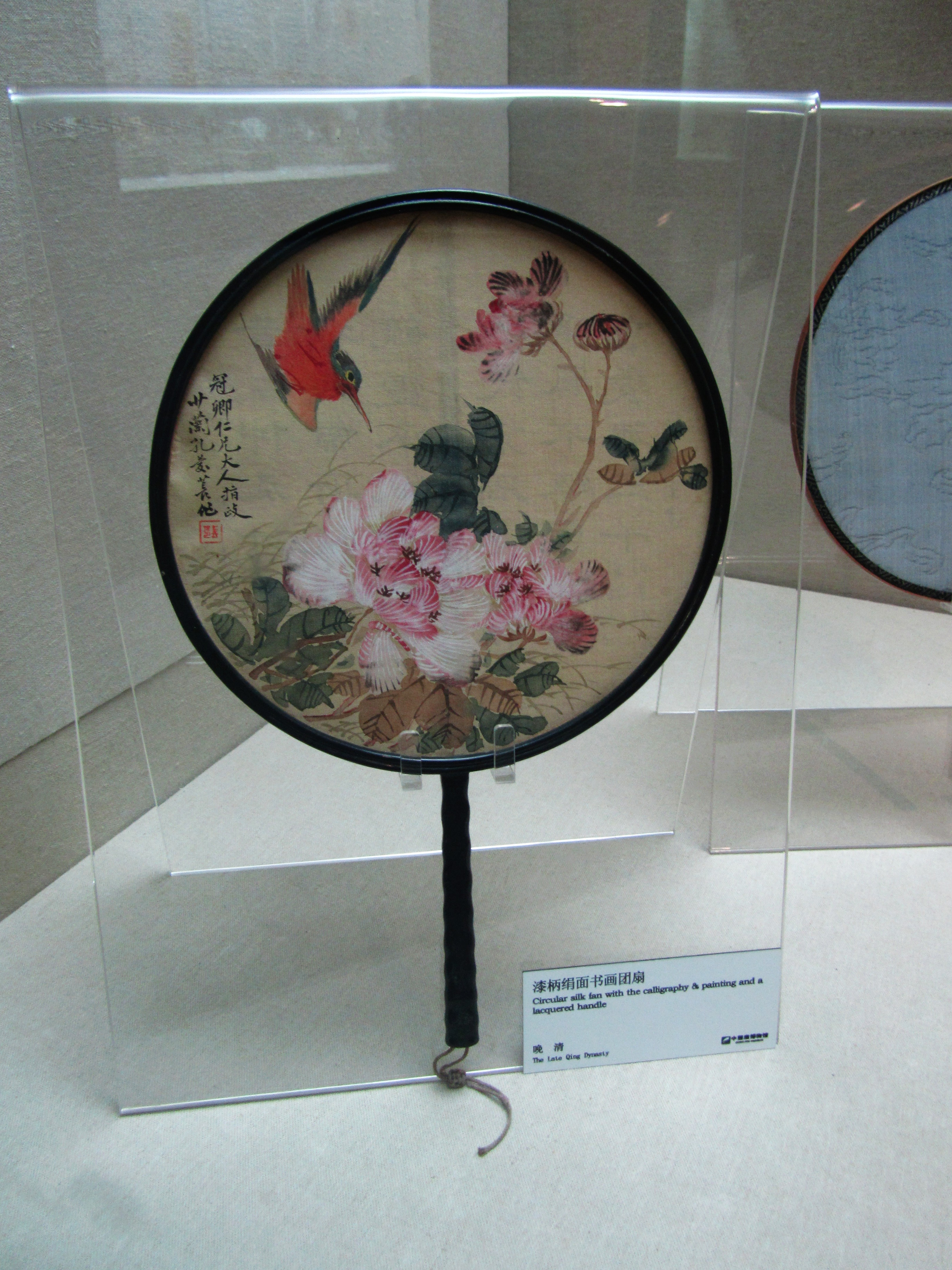
- Type: Circular, rigid Hand fan
- Material: Silk
- Place of origin: China
- Introduced: Japan

Tuanshan

Chinese name
- Traditional Chinese: 團 扇
- Literal meaning: Circular fan
Transcriptions
Standard Mandarin
- Hanyu Pinyin: Tuánshàn

English name
- English: (Chinese) rigid fan/ Pien mien

Tuanshan (Chinese: 團扇; pinyin: tuánshàn; lit. 'circular fan'), also called gongshan (lit. 'palace fan'), bian mian (pien mien), fan of reunion, are typically silk rigid hand fan which originated in China. They are typically circular or oval in shape. Up to the Song dynasty, the tuanshan appears to have the most common types of the fans in China. These types of fans were mostly used by women in the Tang dynasty. Tuanshan with Chinese paintings and with calligraphy became very popular by the Song dynasty among court circles and artists and even continued to be in use even by the end of the 19th century. The tuanshan was also used as part of the traditional Chinese wedding and was part of the ceremonial wedding rite. They continue to be produced and sold in present-day China and has become a common form of accessory in Hanfu.

The tuanshan was also introduced in other countries, such as Japan. The tuanshan also remained mainstream in China even after the growing popularity of the folding fans which originated in Japan.

== Origins ==
The tuanshan originated in China, its prototype was round silk fan which was developed in the Eastern Han dynasty which was itself developed based on the earlier Chinese fans design.

== Cultural significance ==
Fans play a significant aspect in Chinese culture and Chinese life regarding of social identities and ranks, having functional usage such as cooling and facilitates air circulation and was used as a sartorial accessory and held an important ceremonial use. Over time, the Chinese fans have evolved in cultural artifacts which reflects and incorporate the essence of Chinese folklore culture.

=== Wedding ===
Chinese brides also used a type of moon-shaped tuanshan in traditional Chinese wedding called queshan. The ceremonial rite of queshan was an important ceremony in Chinese wedding: the bride would hold it in front of her face to hide her shyness, to remain mysterious, and as a way to exorcise evil spirits. After all the other wedding ceremonies were completed, such as drinking the hejin wine, and after the groom had impressed the bride (e.g. reciting poems), the bride would then proceed in revealing her face to the groom by removing the queshan from her face. This ceremonial rite is referred as Etiquette of removing fan; the performance of such rite can be traced back to the Tang dynasty and continued in the Song dynasty.

== Design and construction ==
The tuanshan is composed of a handle or stick with a rigid mount like a frame and a fabric whose shape will conform to the desired shape of the tuanshan. Traditionally, they were made of bamboo or ivory with silk fabric, which would stretch across the rigid frame. It could be decorated with Chinese embroideries or Chinese paintings.

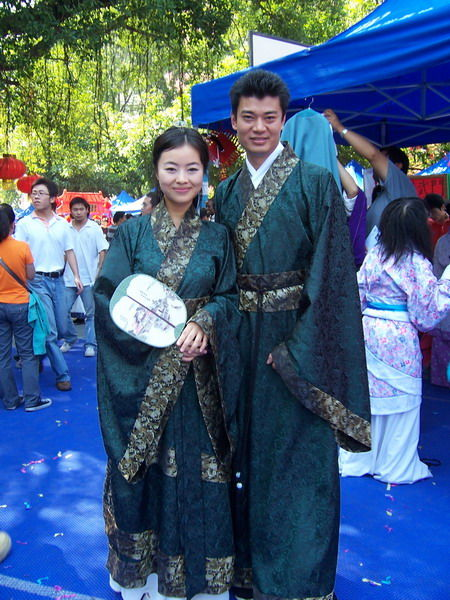
Hanfu enthusiasts in shenyi holding oblong-shaped tuanshan

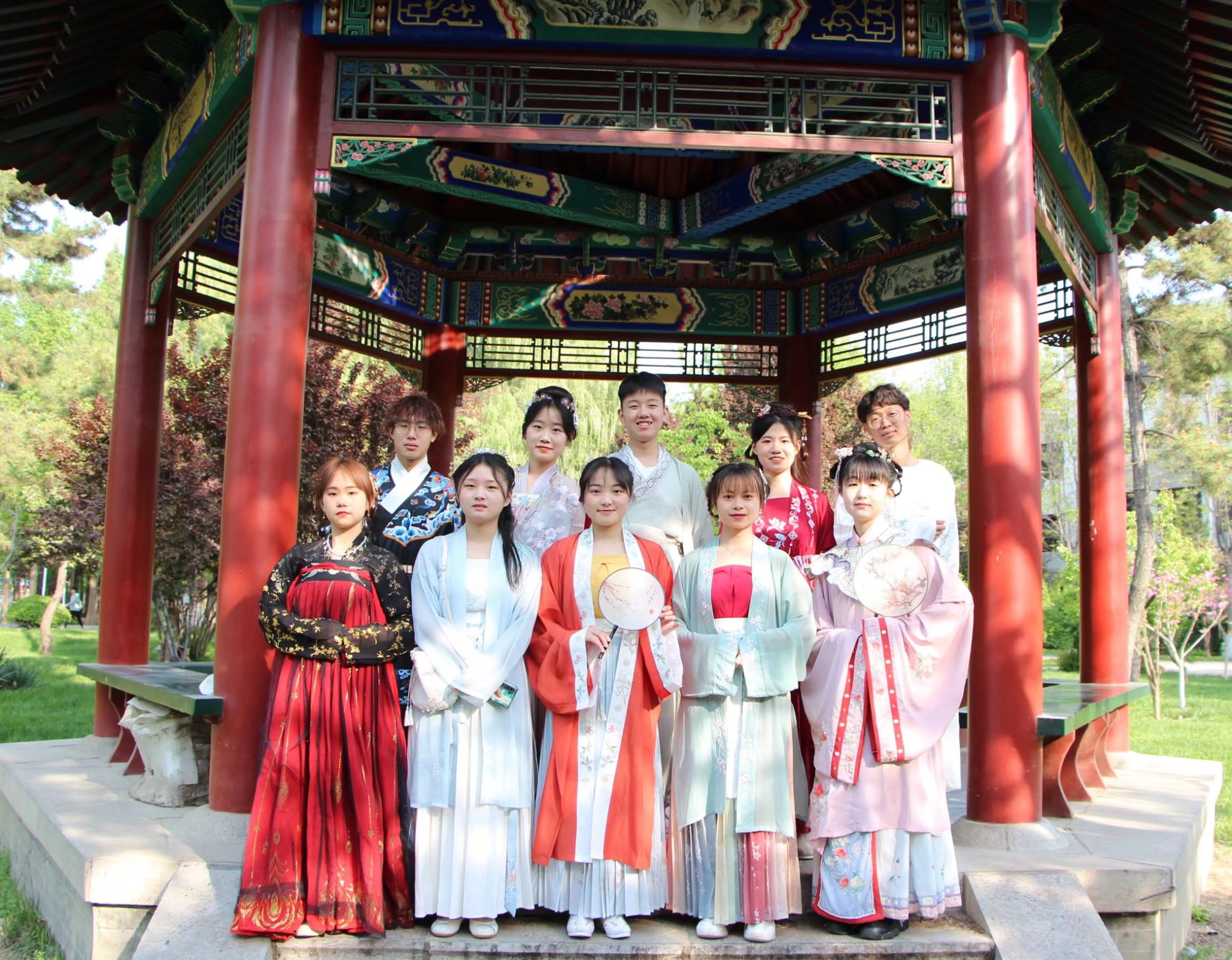
Hanfu enthusiasts holding round-shaped tuanshan

== See also ==
- Hanfu accessories
- Traditional Chinese wedding dress
- Hand fan

== Gallery ==
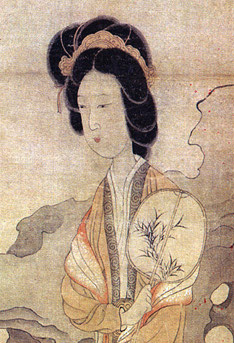
A woman holding a flat oval fan with a Chinese painting from the painting "Appreciating Plums" by Chen Hongshou (1598–1652).

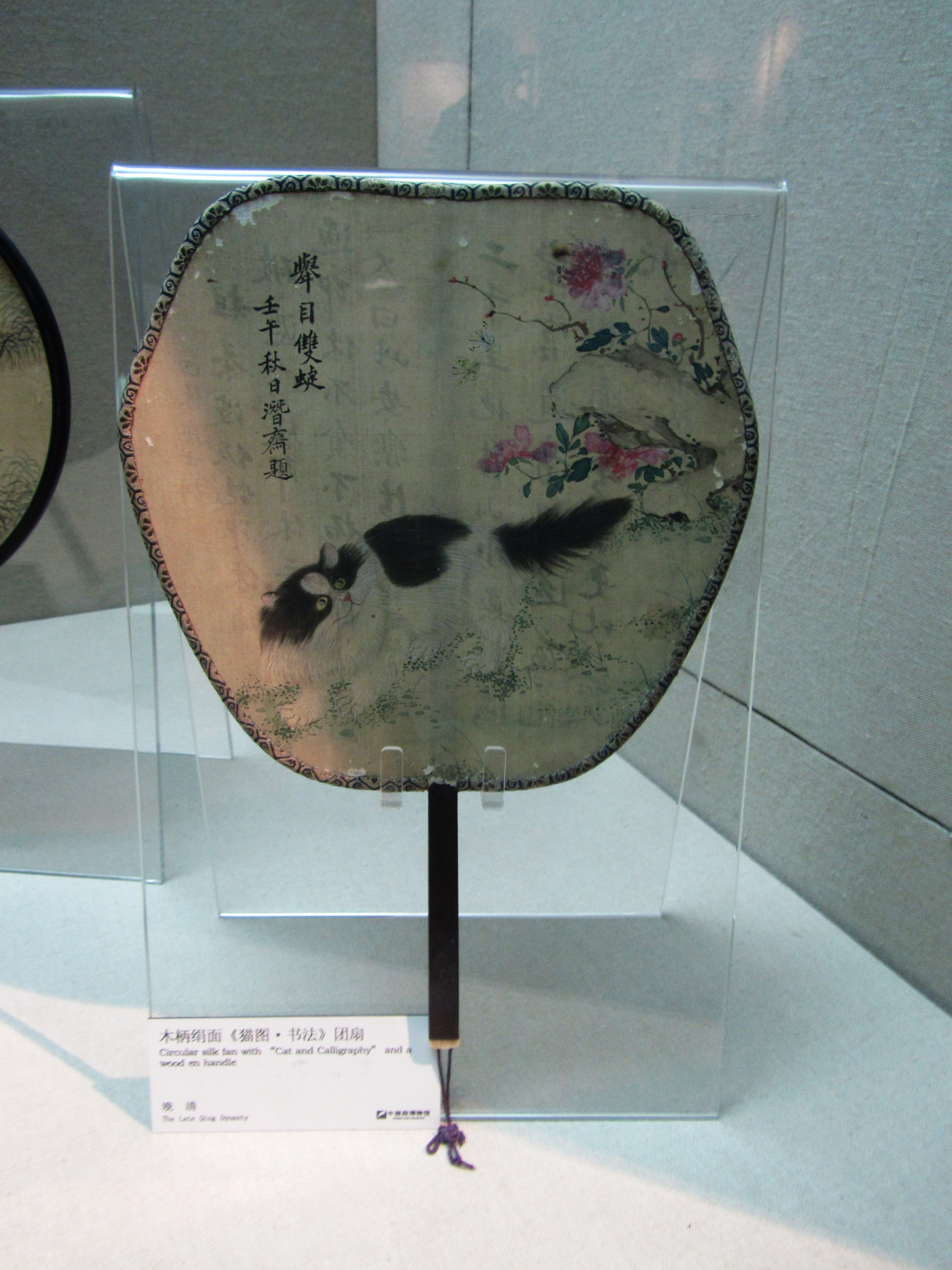
An hexagonal rigid fan with a Chinese painting of a cat and a calligraphy, late Qing dynasty.
