= Chinese wedding door games =

Traditional challenges set for the groom

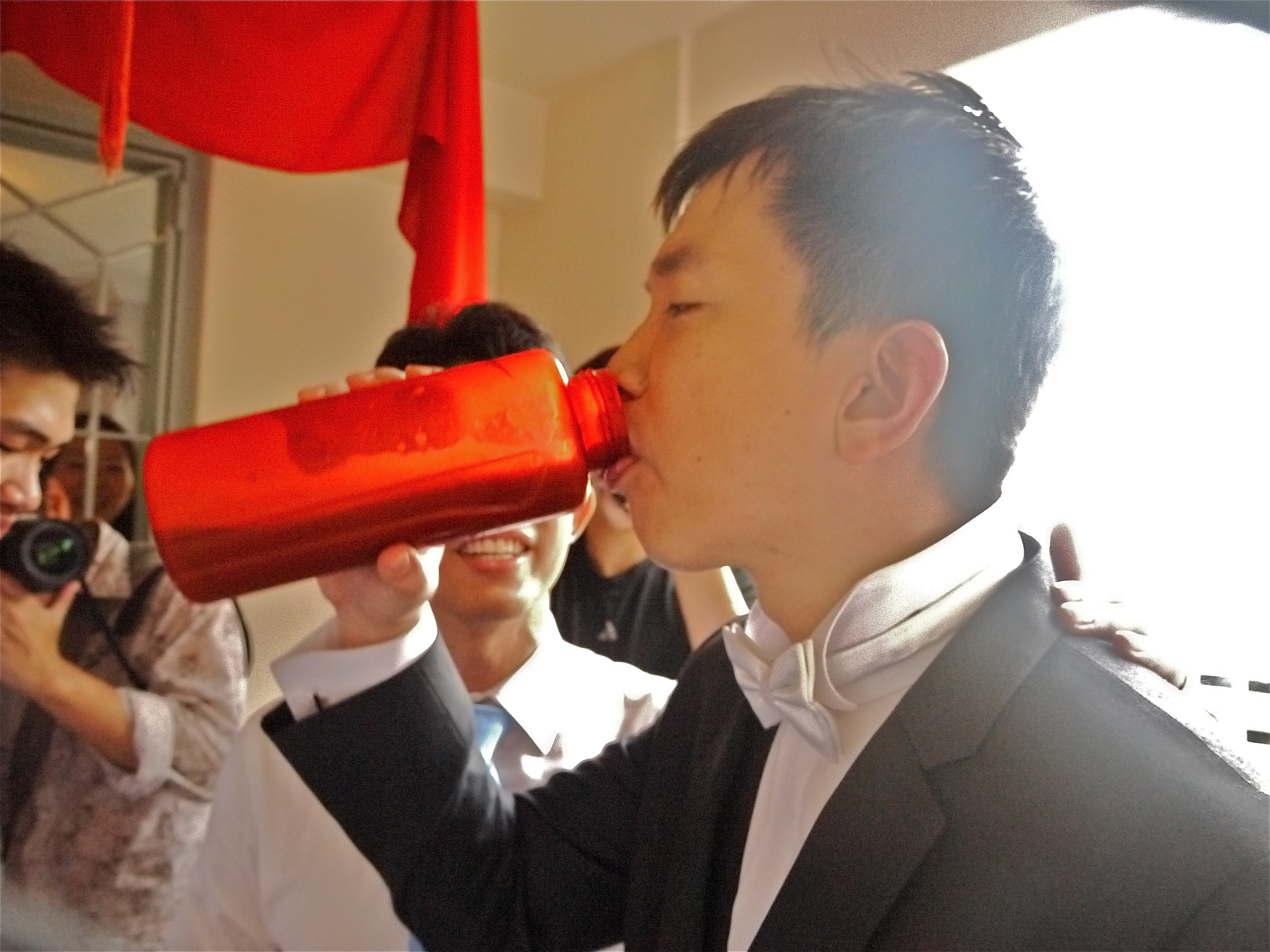
A groom is made to drink an unpleasant concoction by his bride's aunt just before receiving his bride at her family home, in a public housing apartment in Singapore.

In Chinese communities, especially in China, Hong Kong, Malaysia, and Singapore, wedding door games are challenges set up by the bridesmaids for the groom as ceremonial demonstrations of the groom's love for the bride. These games typically take place on the morning of the wedding at the bride's family home, before the groom is allowed to receive the bride in the bride's room. The groom typically receives his groomsmen's help in completing the tasks.

Common games include the consumption of unpleasant foods, answering questions about the bride and the bride and groom's relationship, and performance of song and dance. Negotiations are commonly made over the bridesmaids' demands, accompanied almost always by bargaining over the red envelope offerings to the bridesmaids. These games originate in ancient Chinese folk customs, and have been elaborated on in modern times.

These games are distinct from the practice of nàohūn (闹婚; 'creating turbulence') in China, sometimes confusingly also known as wedding games, in which the couple, particularly the bride, is teased by their guests during or after the wedding.

== Naming ==
Door games are known in Chinese in mainland China as "games with which to receive the groom" jiēqīn yóuxì (接亲游戏) or "games with which to block the door" dǔmén yóuxì (堵门游戏). In Hong Kong, the process is known in Cantonese as "playing with the groom" (玩新郎; wan4 san1 long4).

In Malaysia, these games are called heng dai games, after the Cantonese word for groomsmen (兄弟; hing1 dai6; 'brothers'), while in Singapore, the process is known as the wedding gatecrash.

== Typical components ==
Before the games start, the groom and groomsmen must pay a fee for the bridesmaids to open the door. It is common for the groom and groomsmen to prepare red envelopes filled with cash that they use to negotiate with the bridesmaids who guard the door. These amounts are usually in multiples of auspicious numbers, such as 8, which signifies wealth, or 9, which signifies a long-lasting union. Groomsmen often carry ample red envelopes and try to negotiate with the bridesmaids over how many are required for them to open to the door.

Door games usually include the consumption of unpleasant or strange food or drink. In particular, the groom is made to consume foods that are sour, sweet, bitter and spicy (酸甜苦辣; suāntiánkǔlà; 'joys and sorrows') in succession, to signify his resolve to weather the joys and sorrows of marriage with his partner. Bitter foods include bitter tea and bitter gourd, while spicy foods include wasabi and chilli padi. Declarations of love through words, songs, and poems from the groom may also be requested. It is not uncommon for door games to include physical tests, such as push-ups and cross-dressing, especially in Malaysia and Singapore.

== Contemporary opinions ==
=== Singapore ===
Wedding door games are an opportunity for grooms to demonstrate their resolve and commitment, which some brides appreciate. The practice is also seen by some as a valued tradition and rite of passage. Wedding games may also add to the wedding's fun and excitement.

But the prospect of these challenges may induce anxiety in grooms. In addition, many couples are becoming disillusioned about the games, finding them humiliating and labour-intensive to prepare. Some couples set boundaries on them, such as excluding sexual elements. One wedding photographer estimated in 2016 that roughly 20% of Singaporean Chinese couples do away with door games, even while retaining other elements of a traditional Chinese wedding.
