= Jiaobeijiu =

Chinese traditional wine-exchanged nuptial rite

- Chinese: 交杯酒
- Literal meaning: Cross-cupped wine
Transcriptions
Standard Mandarin
- Hanyu Pinyin: Jiāobēijiǔ

Hejin
- Chinese: 合卺
- Literal meaning: To join nuptial wine cup
Transcriptions
Standard Mandarin
- Hanyu Pinyin: Héjǐn

Jiaobeijiu (Chinese: 交杯酒; lit. 'cross-cupped wine'), also known as Hejin (Chinese: 合卺; pinyin: héjǐn; lit. 'to join nuptial wine cup') in ancient times, is a traditional Chinese nuptial ceremonial rite where newlywed couples interlinking and crossing their arms to sip jiu (Chinese: 酒; lit. 'wine') from two separated cups to their future marital happiness, to promise their lifelong love and to make the vows of no separation in the presence of their guests. This nuptial ceremony can be traced back to the ancient times and already existed in the Qin dynasty; it is suggested that its earliest form had probably started in the late Neolithic period of China; since then, the rite was transmitted down from generation to generation. This ceremony was so common that it gradually became a standard practice in Chinese wedding that people eventually began to refer to marriage as Hejin. This ceremonial rite is still a common practice in Chinese wedding in present-day.

== Origins and evolution ==
The early form of the Jiaobeijiu was known as Hejin in ancient times and probably started in the late Neolithic period. As a wedding custom, the Hejin can be traced back the Zhou dynasty where the newlywed bride and groom would drink wine together in the bridal chamber according to the Liji, the Hejin and was used to symbolize the confirmation of marital union. In the Qin dynasty and prior, the Hejin was already a widely practice ceremony where gourd ladles, called jin (Chinese: 卺; pinyin: jǐn; lit. 'nuptial wine cup'), were used instead of cups. Gourd ladles were the oldest form of Hejin cups and were made by cutting a gourd in half. The bride and groom would hold a gourd ladle to drink the wine in the form of a Hejin ceremony which would symbolizes a harmonious marital life and the promises the couple would never separate from each other. Later on, a bitter fruit from a plant named pao which looked like the jin in appearance was used; since the fruit was bitter it would make the wine bitter, which came to symbolize that married couples were expected "to love and cherish one another, for better or worse, and in sickness or health," as explained in the Liji. Later on during the Tang dynasty, both the jin and pao fruit was replaced by double cups, known as Hejinbei (lit. 'Hejin cup'), which allowed the newlywed couple to hold the two cup ladles and drink together. In the Song dynasty, the Hejinbei were linked with a silk ribbon and the couple would drink from the two linked cups.

== See also ==
- Confucian view of marriage
- Wedding reception in Chinese societies
- Traditional Chinese Wedding dress
