= Chinese pre-wedding customs =

Chinese pre-wedding customs are traditional Chinese rituals prescribed by the Book of Rites, the Book of Etiquette and Ceremonial and the Bai Hu Tong condensed into a series of rituals now known as the 三書六禮 (sàam syù luhk láih) (Three Letters and Six Rites). Traditionally speaking, a wedding that incorporates all six rites is considered a daaih chéui (complete wedding, dà qǔ).

== Traditional rites ==
The six traditional rites involved in a Chinese wedding are as follows:

1. 納采 (nacai) – formal proposal
2. 問名 (wenming) – "ask the name", the groom's side ask the bazi (birth time) of the prospective bride for fortune telling
3. 納吉 (naji) – placement of the bazi at the ancestral altar to confirm compatibility
4. 納徵 (nazheng) – sending of betrothal gifts to the bride and return gifts to the prospective groom
5. 請期 (qingqi) – selection of an auspicious wedding date
6. 親迎 (qinying) – wedding ceremony

== Selection of dates ==
The first step is the selection of auspicious dates (看日子) for the Chinese wedding, the betrothal and the installation of the bridal bed. A Chinese monk or a temple fortune teller selects a suitable date based on the couple's birth dates and times. Some may also refer to the Chinese calendar or almanac for good days. Even numbered months and dates are preferred, and the lunar seventh month is avoided as it is the month of the Hungry Ghost Festival.

After the selection of the auspicious dates, wedding details such as types and quantities of betrothal gifts, reciprocal gifts, bride price (聘金), and number of tables at the wedding banquet provided by the groom's parents for the bride's parents' guests are settled.

== Betrothal ==
Up to three months or earlier before the wedding day, the groom will deliver the betrothal gifts to the bride's family on an auspicious date.

The betrothal (Chinese: 過大禮; pinyin: guo dàlǐ, also known as 納彩 or nàcǎi) is an important part of the Chinese wedding tradition. During this exchange, the groom's family presents the bride's family with betrothal gifts (called 聘礼 or pìnlǐ) to symbolize prosperity and good luck. Moreover, the bride's family receives the bride price (Chinese: 娉金; pinyin: pīng jīn; lit. 'abundant gold') in red envelopes. The bride's family also returns (回禮, huílǐ) a set of gifts to the groom's side. Additionally, the bride's parents bestow a dowry (嫁妝, jiàzhuāng, kè-chng) on the bride.

The selection of betrothal gifts varies by the ancestral regions of the bride and groom. In cases of intermarriage between various Chinese dialect speakers, brides typically follow the groom's ancestral traditions, not the other way around.

The gifts are often in even number for the meaning of in couple and in pairs. Food items given to the bride include wine, oranges, and tea; while jewelry for the bride includes gold earrings, necklaces, bracelets, and rings. In some regions, they are also combined with some local food, such as peanuts and dates (in Chinese, the word for "date" is a near homonym of "early", while "peanut" is "birth"). This is normally presented on the wedding day, with the wishes of giving birth to a child early in the marriage. Candles and paper cut "Double Happiness" are often seen on a wedding day as well.

The bride price, which is given by the groom's family to the bride's family, varies from region to region. In Southern China, the bride price is much higher than in Northern China.

After the betrothal gifts and bride price are negotiated and given, the families select a special date for the wedding. The wedding date is announced via invitations about a month earlier, and the invitations are distributed to the friends and relatives about one or two weeks before the wedding day.

=== Cantonese traditions ===
During the wedding rituals, Cantonese brides invariably don a qungua, a highly embroidered red silk dress, which consists of a petticoat, adorned with the images of a 龍 (lùhng) (dragon) and a 鳳 (fuhng) (phoenix), and a long skirt.

A hair combing ceremony (see description below) is performed.

In addition, the groom is expected to give a pair of matching 龍鳳鈪 (lùhng fuhng ngáak) (dragon and phoenix bracelets), which are most commonly made of gold, to the bride, and are to be worn during the wedding festivities. The dragon and phoenix motif symbolize a blissful union, as described by the Chinese phrase 龍鳳配 (lùhng fuhng pui) (a union of the dragon and phoenix).

On the third day following the wedding, the newlywed bride's first return visit to her family home after marriage is called 歸寧 (gwài nìhng). A 燒豬 (siu jyù) (whole roasted pig) is presented to the bride's family, who customarily will keep the pig's body and return the pig's head and legs, along with other gifts. Traditionally, a perfect roast pig was offered as a sign of the bride's virginity.

=== Hokkien traditions ===
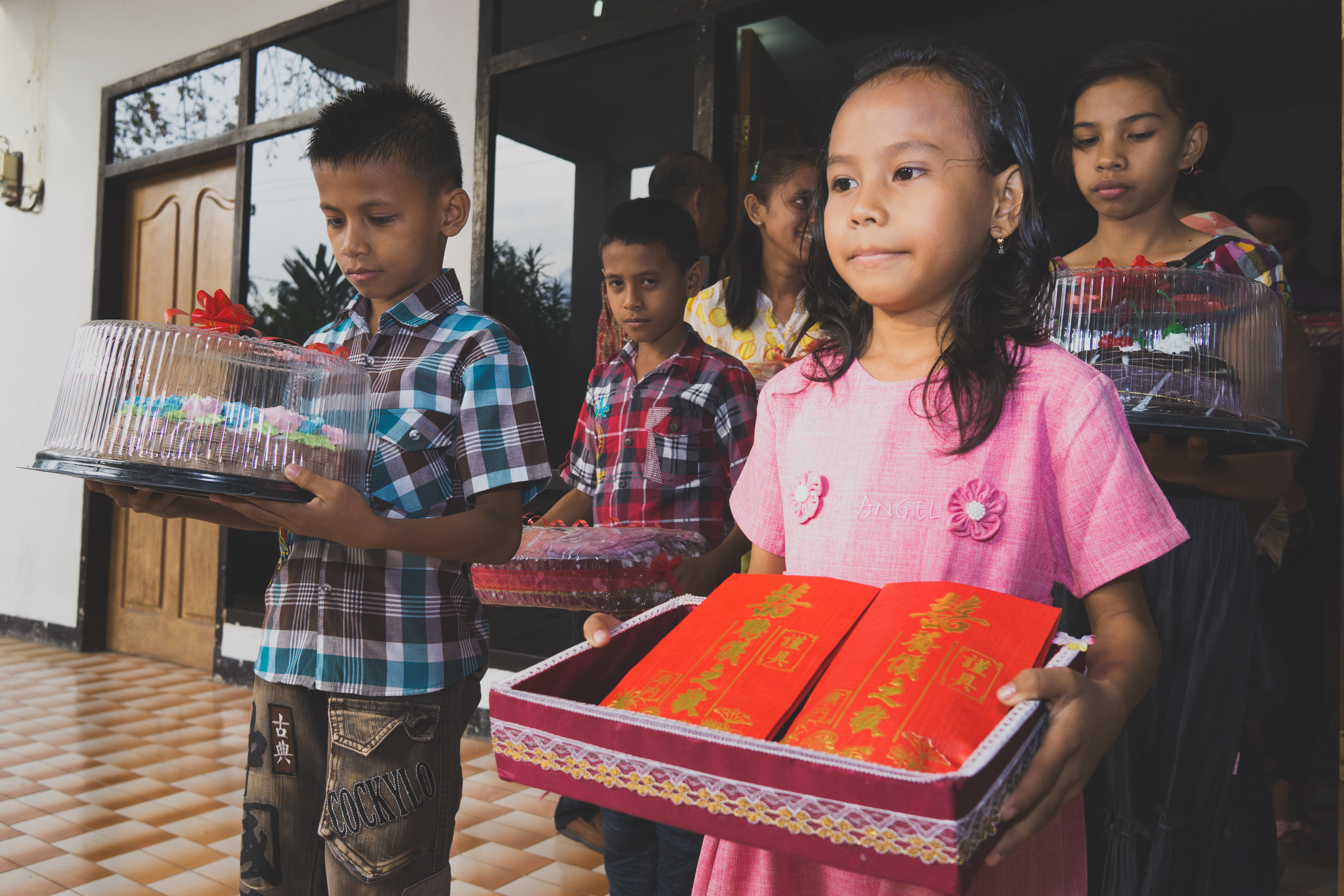
A sangjit at a Maumere-Chinese wedding ceremony

In the Hokkien dialect, the betrothal rite is known as sang jit-thau (送日頭, sàng-ji̍t-thâu) or its abbreviated form sang jit (of which is further loaned into Indonesian as sangjit).

Betrothal gifts unique to the Hokkien include pig trotters and rice candies. Household items are also given to the bride, symbolic of the duties she will assume as wife.

Among the most important return gifts for the Hokkien is a set of silver coins called yuánqián (緣錢) or dà yuán (大緣) and xiǎo yuán (小緣), given by the bride to the groom's siblings.

A Hokkien tradition is for the bride's family to offer a spittoon replete with red dates, dried longans and lotus seeds, along with other sweets, sealed with red paper, as part of the dowry.

On the day of the wedding, the bride's mother is presented with an uncooked pork leg, to show gratitude for her caretaking.

The Hokkien traditionally incorporate sugarcane as a motif during wedding celebrations for protection; it is tied to the doorpost of the couple's home and to the bridal carriage. This practice stems from a traditional legend in which Hokkiens were spared from a massacre by a Song dynasty emperor by hiding in sugarcane fields. Sugarcane also features a prominent role during the ninth day of Chinese New Year celebrations (marking the Jade Emperor's birthday).

During the eve of the wedding ceremony, Hokkien families pay respects to the Jade Emperor, called in Thiⁿ-kong Hokkien (天公, lit. Lord of Heaven), to seek his protection. Six food dishes and five kinds of fruit are offered as well.

=== Teochew traditions ===
The foremost Teochew betrothal gift is the sì diǎnjīn (四點金), four pieces of jewelry including a gold necklace, a pendant, a pair of earrings and a bangle selected by a groom's mother and presented to the bride during the tea ceremony. Since sì diǎnjīn is also the name of a traditional Chinese architectural style, a four-pointed curved roof found in traditional homes, the jewelry symbolizes a blissful union in a secure home.

The Teochew also give flaky pastries similar to hopia, as well as peanut candies. If the bride's grandmother is still alive, pastries called laoma gao (老嬷糕) are offered to her.

== Delivery of the bride's dowry ==
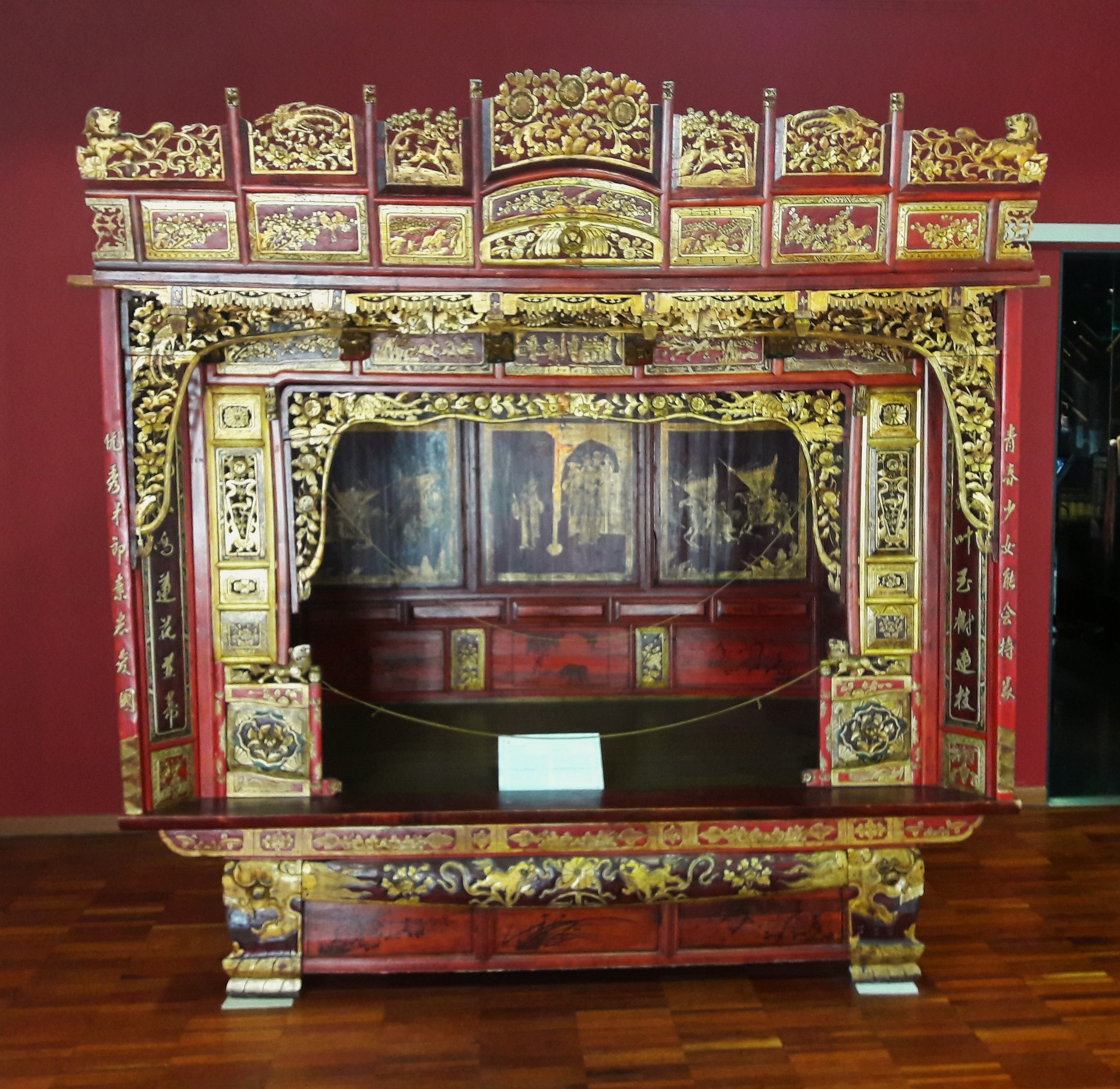
Traditional bridal bed, early 20th century, Asia and Pacific Museum in Warsaw

The bride's parents may include the 嫁妝 gaa jòng (bride's dowry) (jiàzhuāng) along with the reciprocal gifts on the day of betrothal, or may present the bride's dowry separately a few days before the wedding ceremony. Chinese dowries typically include:

- bedding (e.g. pillows, bolsters, comforter set, blankets, bed sheets)
- new clothing for the bride, delivered in a suitcase (in the past, wardrobes or wooden wedding chests were used)
- tea set for the wedding tea ceremony
- a tub filled with baby items (子孙桶, which may include a baby bathtub, baby potty, washbasin, tumblers, toothpaste and toothbrush, mirror, comb, etc.)
- two pairs of red wooden clogs, wedding slippers or bedroom slippers
- a sewing basket (with even numbered rolls of colourful thread, needles, pincushion, scissors, and sewing wax with auspicious words on it)
- gold jewellery given by bride's parents

== Installation of the bridal bed ==
Another ritual is the installation of the bridal bed (安床, ān chuáng). At an auspicious date and time, a woman of good fortune installs the bridal bed in the bridal room. New red or pink bedsheets are used and a plate of dried longans, lotus seeds, red dates, persimmons, sprig of pomegranate leaves together with two red packets are placed on the bed. A pair of bedside lamps (子孙灯) is lit to symbolize the addition of sons to the family.

== Hair combing ceremony ==
A hair combing ceremony (梳頭, sò tàuh) is also conducted on the eve of the wedding. After showering with water infused with pomelo or pomegranate leaves, the bride and groom change into a new set of clothing and shoes. Attending female family members bless them aloud as they sit in front of an open window with the visible moon or in front of the mirror.

The four blessings are:

- 一梳、梳到尾、 (yàt sò sò dou méih) (with the first combing, be blessed to be together to the end,)
- 二梳、百年好合、 (yih sò baak nìhn hóu hahp) (with the second combing, be blessed with a hundred years of harmony in marriage,)
- 三梳、子孫滿堂、 (sàam sò jí syùn múhn tòhng) (with the third combing, be blessed with a houseful of children and grandchildren)
- 四梳、白發齊眉、 (sei sò baahk faat chàih mèih) (with the fourth combing, be blessed with longevity)

A sweet dessert soup containing pink glutinous-rice spherical dumplings called tòng yùhn is served after the hair combing ceremony to wish the couple a complete and sweet marriage.

== Chinese wedding decorations ==
Decorations with the double happiness symbol will be placed on all wedding items such as the betrothal gifts, dowry, the couple's toiletries and cosmetics. The bridal room furniture, especially the mirror and cupboards, will also be decorated with double joy or other wedding paper cutouts such as pairs of mandarin ducks, dragon and phoenix, etc. Similar red wedding paper cutouts will also be put up on the main door, bridal room door and generally around the house.

A red banner (红彩帘) will be hung across the front doors of the two household to announce the joyous event.

Even overseas Chinese, such as in Singapore, who marry will also apply the same double happiness decorations and customs as in China. Chinese couples in multi-racial countries like Singapore may also retain their own Cantonese, Teochew, Hokkien, and other traditions depending on their origin and Chinese language spoken.

== See also ==
- Chinese wedding reception
- Chinese marriage
