= Confucian view of marriage =

To the Confucians, marriage is of important significance both in the family and in society. The Confucian classic Book of Rites described marriage as "the union of two surnames, in friendship and in love". In the perspective of family, marriage can bring families of different surnames (different clans) together, and continue the family life of the concerned clans. Therefore, only the benefits and demerits of the clans, instead of the individual couples, are concerned in a marriage. Socially, a married couple is the basic unit of the population; sometimes marriages can affect the country's political stability and international relations (especially to certain foreign tribes like Mongolians, Manchus, Huns, and Turks); thus marriage can be related to politics.

From the point of view of Confucian philosophy, one of the purposes of marriage is the cultivation of virtue. In the Chinese term for marriage (Chinese: 婚姻; pinyin: hūn yīn), hūn (婚) is derived from hūn (昏, literally means "evening" or "dusk") in ancient writings, though the former has the radical character nǚ (女, literally means a female). This is because wedding ceremonies were typically performed in the evenings when yang (representing days/male) and yin (representing nights/female) cross over. 婚 was defined as the father of a man's wife (e.g. a man's father-in-law) in Erya, but now it generally means "marriage" in Modern Standard Chinese. Yīn (姻), on the other hand, was defined as the father of a daughter's husband in Erya, but now generally means "marriage" or "relation by marriage" in Modern Chinese. The character has the same pronunciation as its phonetic component 因 (yīn). According to Shuowen Jiezi, a dictionary of ancient Chinese characters, 因 in this character is not only a phonetic component but also means to "go to" one's husband.

== Further influences on marriage ==
Due to the concept of filial piety and following rites of propriety, marriage was a costly affair and seen as second only to funeral ceremonies. The use of a matchmaker was meant to ensure that the husband and wife were compatible with each other and that the marriage followed proper rituals, but primarily worked in the families' best interests.

== See also ==
- Chinese marriage
- Confucius
- Confucianism
