= Traditional Chinese marriage =

Traditional marriage customs

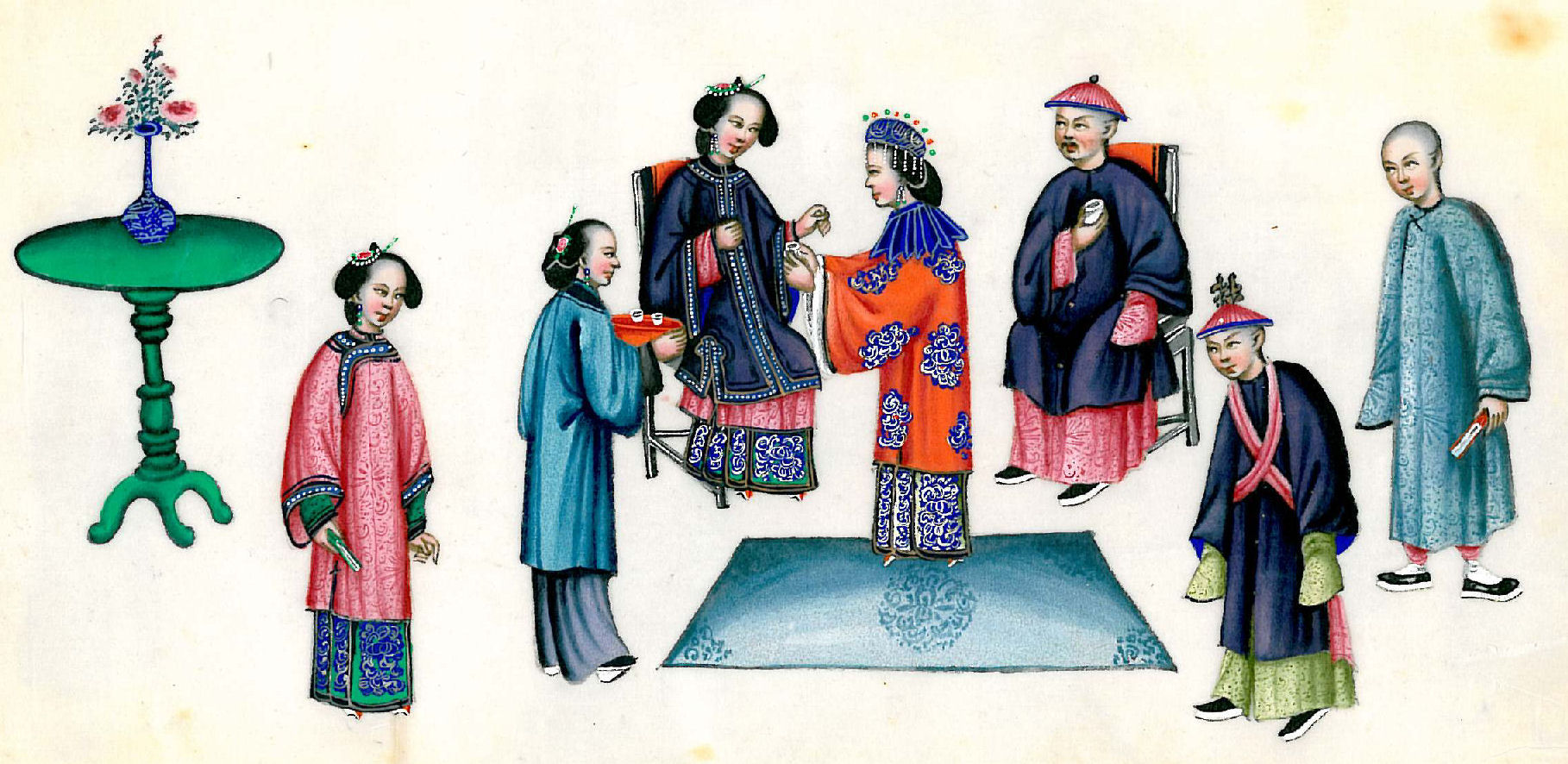
A Qing dynasty wedding. The groom's parents are seated. The bride is the one in the centre wearing a red dress and blue headpiece, presenting tea to her mother-in-law. The groom usually wears a sash forming an "X" in front of him. Sometimes the "X" includes a giant bow or flower, though not in this picture.

Traditional Chinese marriage (Chinese: 婚姻; pinyin: hūnyīn) is a ceremonial ritual within Chinese societies that involves not only a union between spouses but also a union between the two families of a man and a woman, sometimes established by pre-arrangement between families. Marriage and family are inextricably linked, which involves the interests of both families. Within Chinese culture, monogamy was prescribed where a man was allowed to have one formal wife (妻 or 正妻), although in practise they were always allowed to have additional concubines (妾). Around the end of primitive society, traditional Chinese marriage rituals were formed, with deer skin betrothal in the Fuxi era, the appearance of the "meeting hall" during the Xia and Shang dynasties, and then in the Zhou dynasty, a complete set of marriage etiquette ("six rituals") gradually formed. The richness of this series of rituals proves the importance the ancients attached to marriage. In addition to the unique nature of the "three letters and six rituals", monogamy, remarriage and divorce in traditional Chinese marriage culture are also distinctive.

== Etymology ==
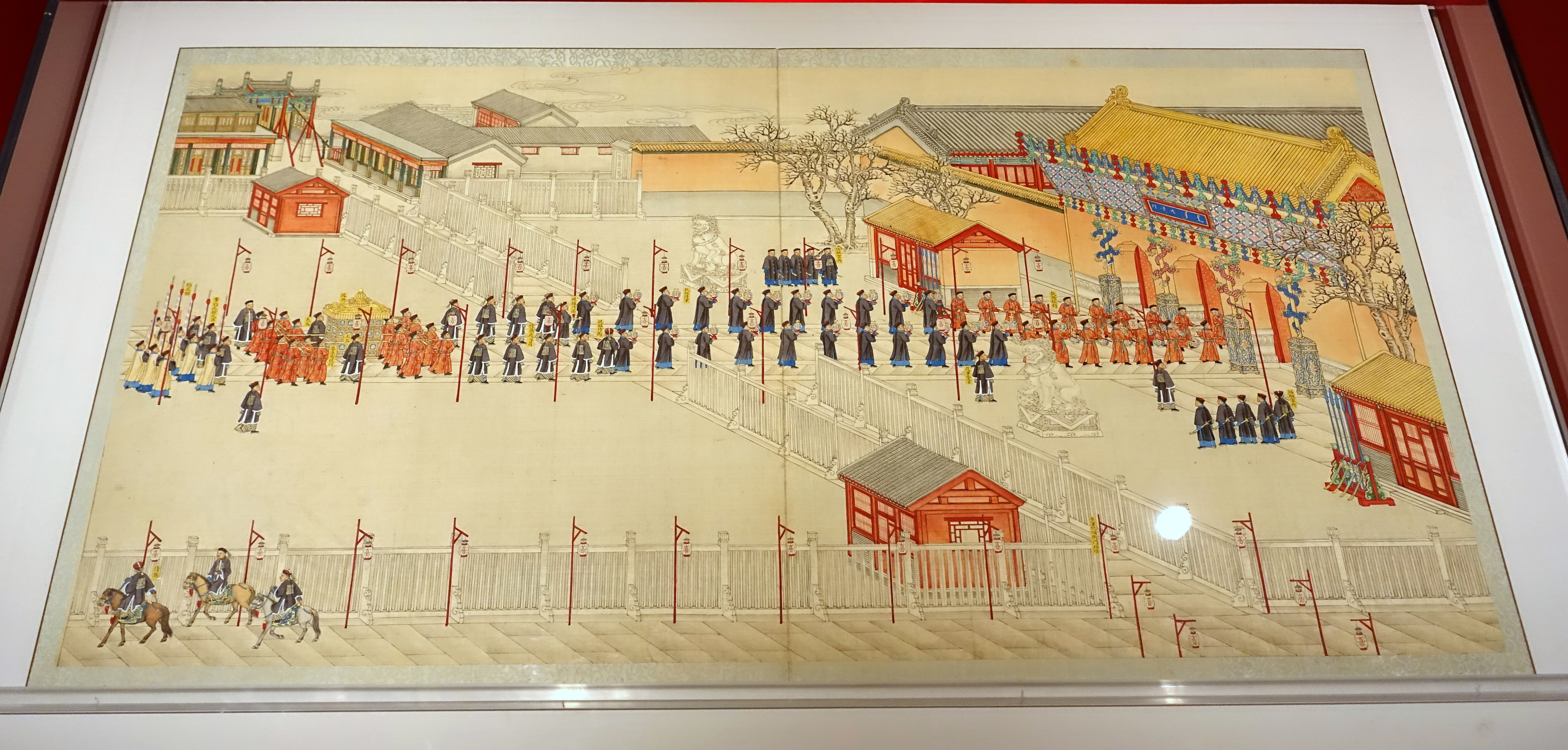
Wedding procession of the Guangxu Emperor, 1889

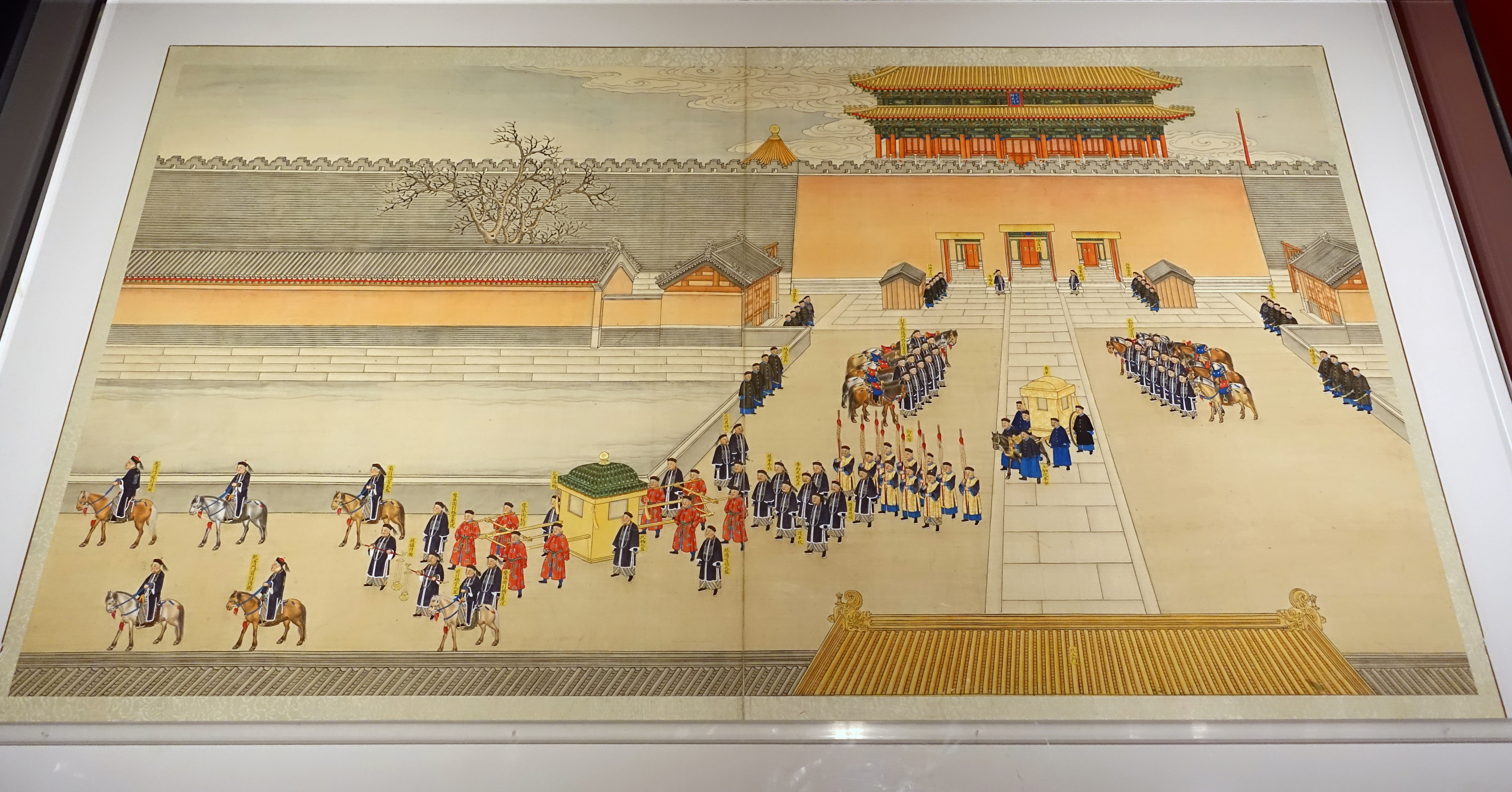
Wedding procession of the Guangxu Emperor

The two-Chinese character word 婚姻 (hūnyīn; 'marriage') can be analyzed as follows:

- 婚 (hūn) was defined as the father of a man's wife (e.g. a man's father-in-law) in Erya, the earliest known Chinese dictionary; but now it generally means "marriage" in Modern Standard Chinese. The character has the phonetic component 昏 (hūn; "dusk, nightfall, twilight, dark") beside the radical as well as the semantic component 女 (nǚ; "female"). The phonetic component 昏 itself was used as the ancient (original) form of 婚 in Old Chinese. This implies that wedding ceremonies were typically performed in the evenings when yang (representing days/male) and yin (representing nights/female) cross over.
- 姻 (yīn) was defined as the father of a daughter's husband in Erya, but now generally means "marriage" or "relation by marriage" in Modern Chinese. The character has the same pronunciation as its phonetic component 因 (yīn). According to Shuowen Jiezi, a dictionary of ancient Chinese characters, 因 in this character is not only a phonetic component but also means to "go to" or to "follow" one's husband.

== Marriage in a Confucian context ==
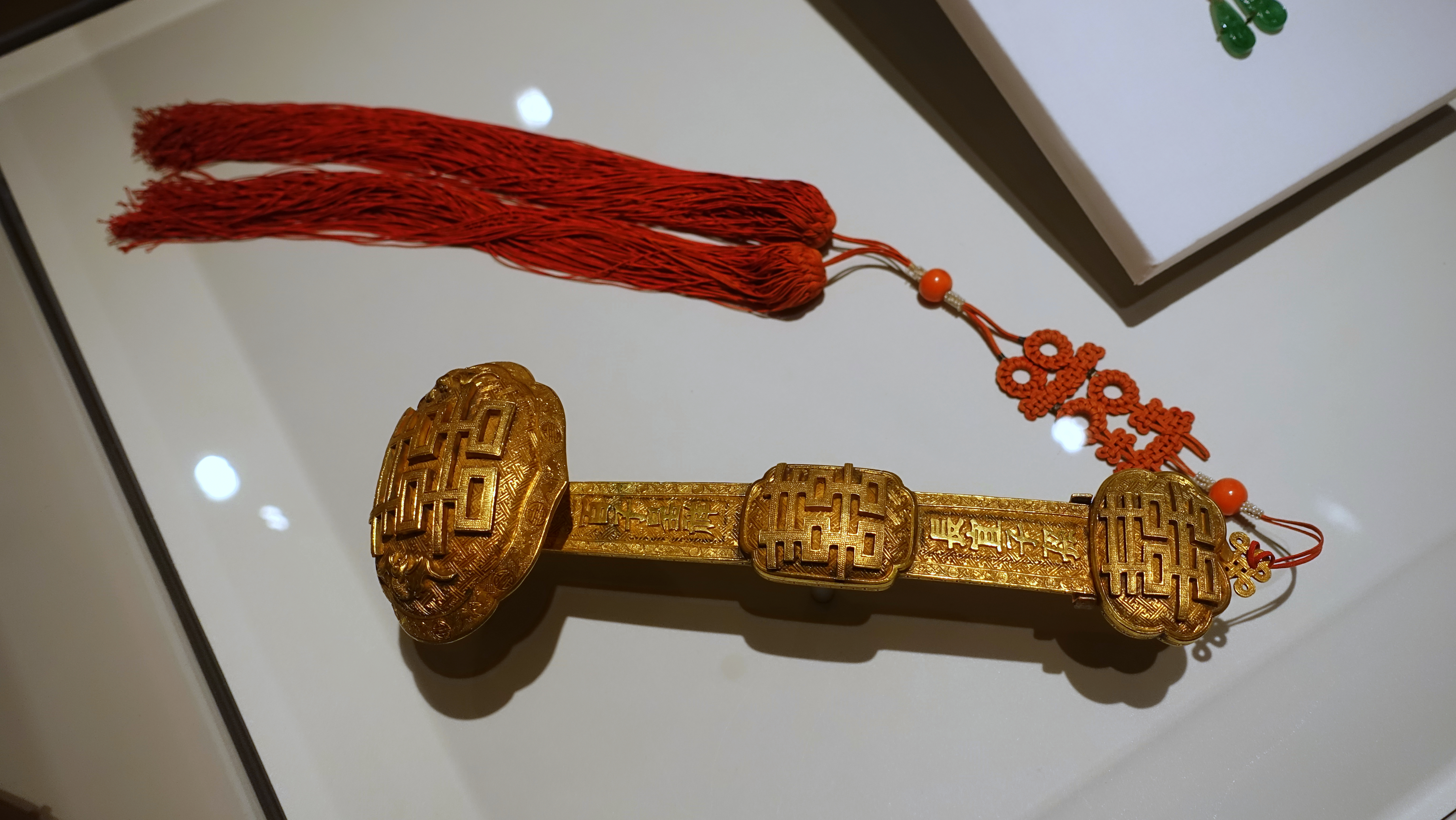
Ruyi (wish granting scepter) used in Empress Xiaoding's wedding

In Confucian thought, marriage is of grave significance to both families and society, as well as being important for the cultivation of virtue. Traditionally, incest has been defined as marriage between people with the same surname.

"One of the earliest marriage prohibitions, and one surviving to this day, was that forbidding persons of the same surname to marry. An imperial decree of 484 A.D. states that this rule was promulgated far back in the Zhou dynasty, which was from 1122 to 255 B.C.' Any one marrying within his clan received sixty blows, and the marriage was declared null and void. It was feared that such mating would produce weak offspring."

From the perspective of a Confucian family, marriage brings together families of different surnames and continues the family line of the paternal clan. This is generally why giving birth to a boy is preferred over a girl. Therefore, the benefits and demerits of any marriage are important to the entire family, not just the individual couples. Socially, the married couple is thought to be the basic unit of society. In Chinese history, there have been many times when marriages have affected the country's political stability and international relations. For International Relations, "intermarriage has continued throughout Chinese history as a means of establishing and maintaining relations among families in the private sphere, as well as a factor in political careers. " For example, "Marriage alliances, or ho-ch'in 和亲, literally 'harmonious kinship,' was something new in its Han-era application. It was a part of a formal peace treaty arrangement at the interstate level, designed to pacify the powerful Hsiung-nu (匈奴) empire" During the Han dynasty, the rulers of the powerful Xiongnu tribe demanded women from the imperial family. Many periods of Chinese history were dominated by the families of the wife or mother of the ruling emperor. For the country's political stability, during the Qing dynasty, although no "evidence of prohibitions against ethnic intermarriage within the Eight Banners", "in elite families of the ruling class, primary wives were almost entirely Manchu, while qie (commonly translated as "concubines") and other partners of lower status could be Han". In the Qing dynasty, most of the high officials were mainly Manchu, so in order to protect the interests of the family, the selection of a wife will be very important. in particular, if whether the woman was born in the "eight banners". For example, "the ethnicity apparent in the maiden names of wives in genealogies from elite Manchu descent groups, such as the Imperial Lineage."

== Role of women in marriages ==
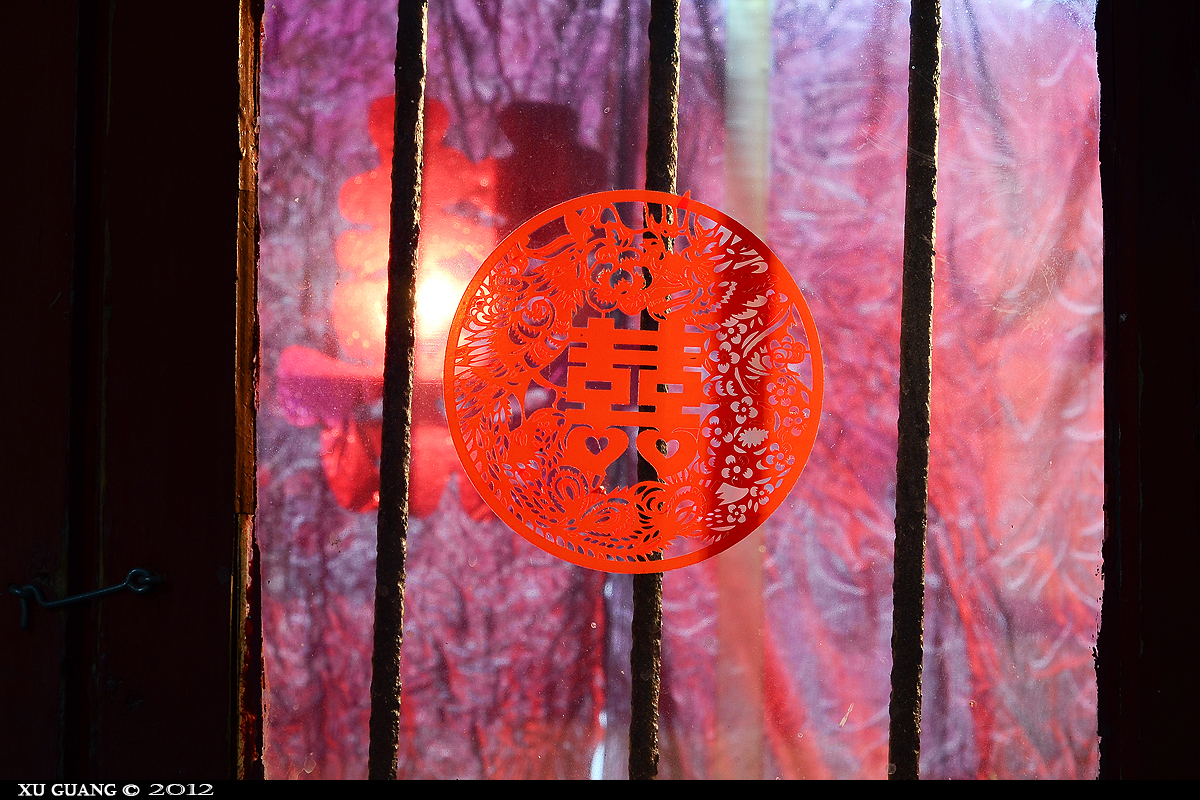
The Double Happiness (双喜) character decoration is auspicious at Chinese weddings

The bride had to leave her family to become a daughter-in-law, subject to the authority of her husband's mother. In this role, she could witness the addition of secondary wives or concubinage, especially if she failed to produce a male heir. The husband could repudiate her for various reasons, and in the event of his death, remarrying was a challenge. This situation underscored the lack of economic independence for women, as their labor focused on household duties without bringing in income. Farm women were largely illiterate, and they had minimal to no property rights.

Ancient China perceived the world as the result of the interplay between two complementary elements, yin and yang. Yin represented all things female, dark, weak, and passive, while yang represented all things male, bright, strong, and active. Although both male and female were deemed necessary and complementary, one was passive in relation to the other. Building on these ideological foundations, Chinese male moralists developed behavioral norms of obedience and passivity expected of women.

These norms placed girls subordinate to boys from infancy and maintained the wife's subordination to her husband and the mother's subordination to her grown son. Status within the family was formally outlined in the renowned "three bonds" accentuated by Confucian philosophers. These bonds included the allegiance of subjects to rulers, the filial obedience of sons to fathers, and the chastity expected from wives but not husbands. While the theory did not emphasize the relationship between mother and son it held practical importance.

When a father perceived the emergence of individuality and independence in his son, he harbored concerns about potential disruption to the family. Strong bonds of intimacy between the son and either mother or wife posed a potential threat to the vertical lines of loyalty and respect that upheld the family structure and the father's authority. Women were deemed destabilizers, even though they promised of descendants, they also posed a constant threat to the bond of obedience between parents and sons.

== Ancient Chinese marriages ==
=== Marriages in early societies ===
Women and men were married relatively young. For the women, it was soon after puberty and men were not much later, around fifteen and twenty respectively.

=== Mythological origin ===
The story about the marriage of sister and brother Nüwa and Fu Xi told how they invented proper marriage procedures after marrying. At that time, the world was unpopulated so the siblings wanted to get married, but at the same time, they felt ashamed. They went up to Kunlun Mountains and prayed to the heavens. They asked for permission for their marriage and said, "if you allow us to marry, please make the mist surround us." The heavens gave permission to the couple, and promptly the peak was covered in mist. It is said that in order to hide her shyness, Nüwa covered her blushing face with a fan. Nowadays in some villages in China, the brides still follow the custom and use a fan to shield their faces.

=== Historic marriage practices ===
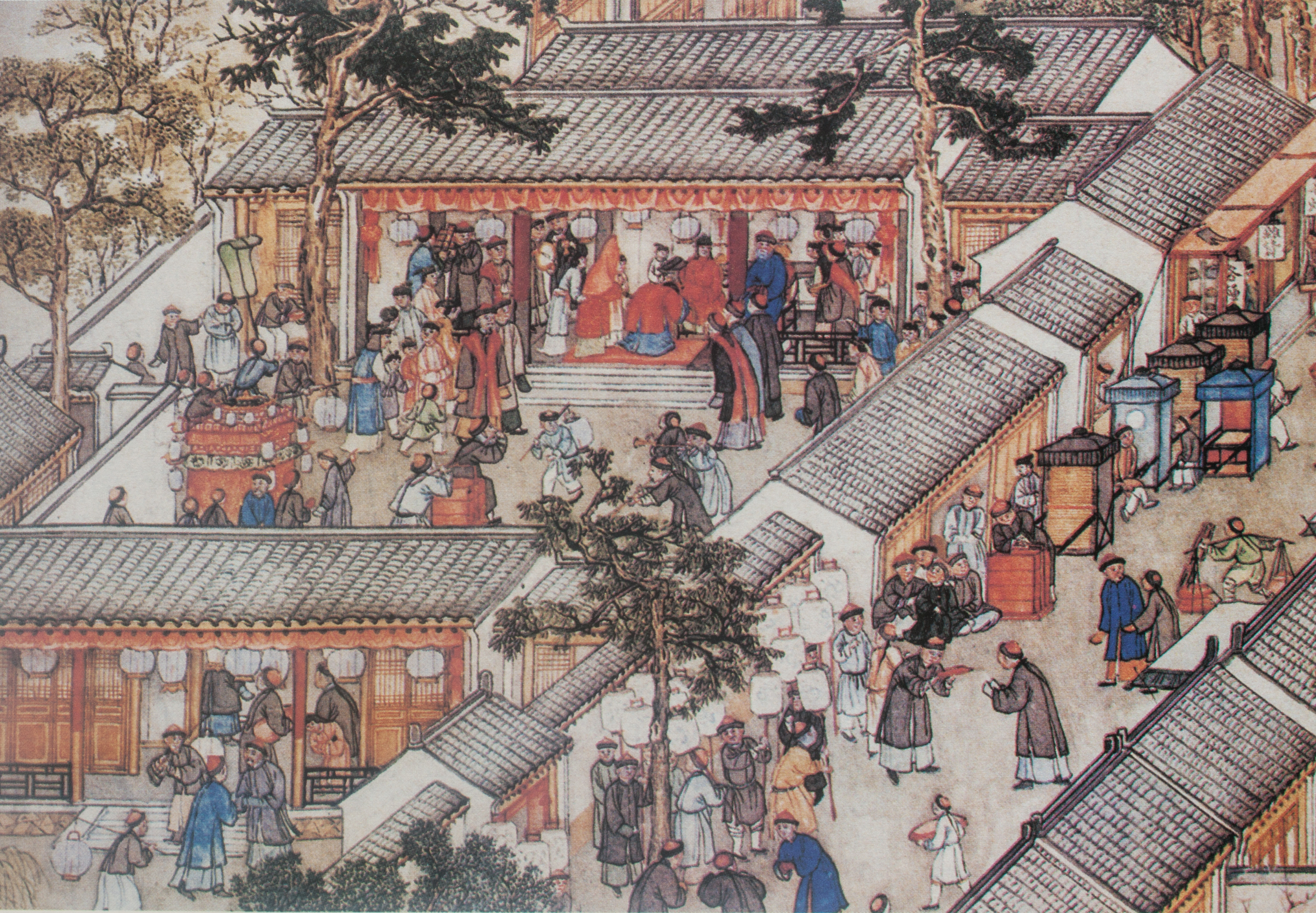
Marriage ceremony, Prosperous Suzhou by Xu Yang, 1759

Endogamy among different classes in China was practiced, the upper class, such as the Shi, married among themselves. Commoners married among themselves as well, avoiding marriage with slaves and other ordinary people. This practice was enforced under the law.

=== Maternal marriage and monogamy ===
In a maternal marriage, the husband moved in the woman's family home after the marriage. This happened in the transformation of antithetic marriage into monogamy, which signified the decline of matriarchy and the growing dominance of patriarchy in ancient China.

=== Marriage during the Han dynasty (202 BC – 220 AD) ===
Marriages during this time included a number of mandatory steps. The most important of them was the presentation of betrothal gifts from the groom and his family to the bride and her family. The bride's family then countered with a dowry. Sometimes the bride's family would buy goods with the betrothal money. Using a betrothal gift for family financial needs rather than saving it for the bride was viewed as dishonorable because it appeared as though the bride has been sold. A marriage without a dowry or betrothal gifts was also seen as dishonorable, as the bride was then seen as a concubine instead of a wife. Once all the goods were exchanged, the bride was taken to the groom's ancestral home. There she was expected to obey her husband and live with his relatives. Women continued to belong to their husband's families even if they had passed. If the widow's birth family wanted her to marry again, they would often have to ransom her back from her deceased husband's family. If they had any children they stayed with his family.

=== Marriage matchmakers during the Ming dynasty ===
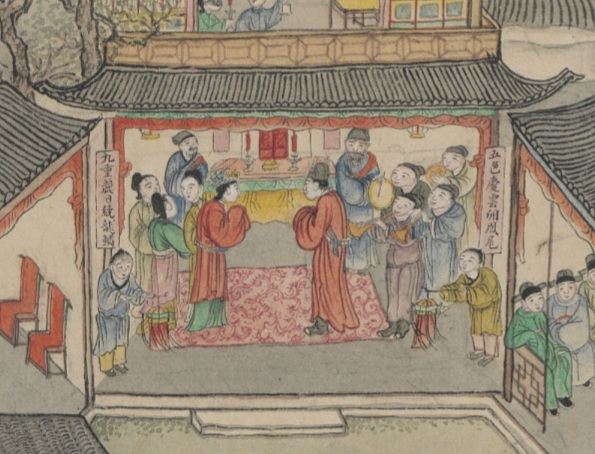
Wedding in Suzhou, Ming dynasty, 17th c.

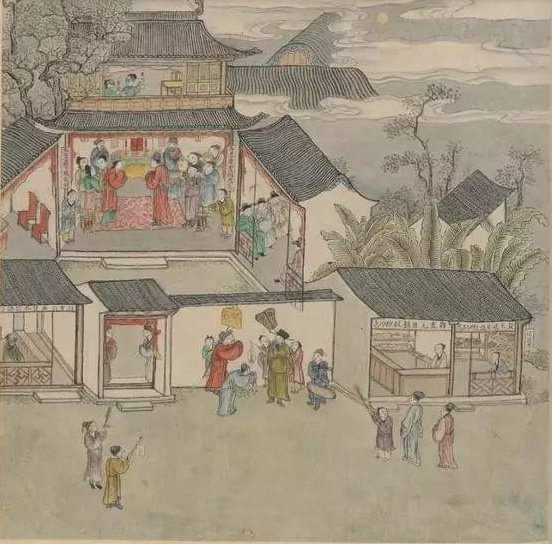
Wedding in Suzhou, Ming period, 17th c.

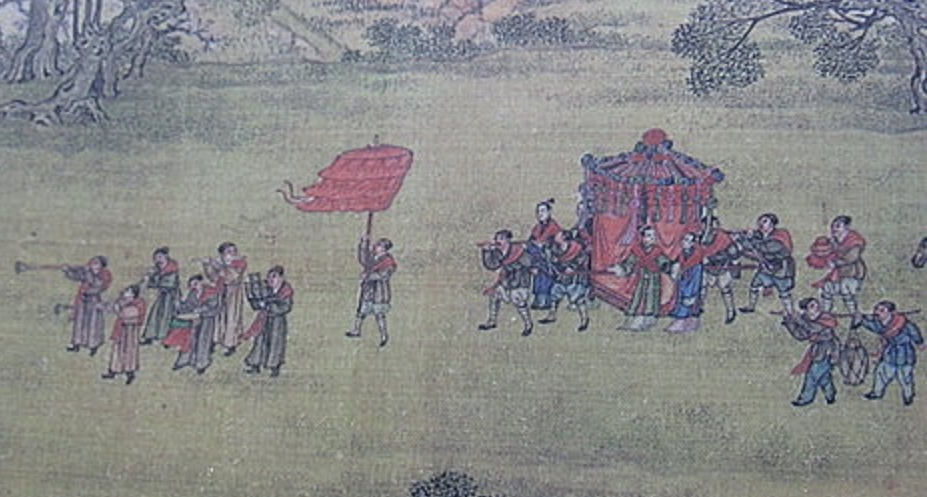
Wedding procession, Qing dynasty copy of Along the River During the Qingming Festival

In the Ming period, marriage was considered solemn and according to the law written in The Ming Code (Da Ming Lü), all commoners' marriages must follow the rules written in Duke Wen's Family Rules (Wen Gong Jia Li). The rules stated that "in order to arrange a marriage, an agent must come and deliver messages between the two families." A marriage matchmaker had the license to play important roles by arranging marriages between two families. Sometimes both families were influential and wealthy and the matchmaker bonded the two families into powerful households. Studies have shown that, "In the Ming and Qing dynasties, a number of noble families emerged in Jiaxing of Zhejiang, where marriage is the most important way to expand their clan strength." Hence, marriage matchmakers were crucial during the Ming era, and offer an insight into the lives of the Ming commoners.

Instead of using the more gender-neutral term "mei ren" (媒人), texts more frequently referred to marriage matchmakers as "mei po" (媒婆). Since "po" (婆) translates to "granny" in English, it suggests that elderly female characters dominated the "marriage market". Indeed, in the novel The Golden Lotus (Jin Ping Mei), the four matchmakers, Wang, Xue, Wen, and Feng, were all elderly female characters. In ancient China, people believed that marriages belong to the "Yin" side (the opposite of "Yang"), which corresponds to females. In order to maintain the balance between Yin and Yang, women should not interfere with the Yang side and men should not interfere with the Yin side. Since breaking the balance may lead to disorder and misfortune, men were rarely seen in marriage arrangements. Furthermore, unmarried girls were not in the occupation because they themselves knew little about marriage and were not credible in arranging marriages. As a result, almost all marriage matchmakers in literature were presented as elderly females.

Being a successful marriage matchmaker required various special skills. First, the matchmaker had to be very persuasive. The matchmaker had to persuade both sides of the marriage that the arrangement was impeccable, even though many times the arrangement was not perfect. In Feng Menglong's "Old Man Zhang Grows Melons and Marries Wennü" in the collection Stories Old and New (Gu Jin Xiao Shuo), he wrote about an eighty-year-old man who married an eighteen-year young girl. The marriage was arranged by two matchmakers, Zhang and Li. Given the age difference, the marriage seemed impossible, but the two matchmakers still managed to persuade the father of the girl to marry her to the old man. Feng Menglong described them as "Once they start to speak the match is successfully arranged, and when they open their mouths they only spoke about harmony." The matchmakers gave powerful persuasions by avoiding mentioning the differences between the couples they arranged. In addition to persuasion techniques, the matchmakers must possess great social skills. They needed to know a network of people so that when the time came for marriage, they were able to seek the services of the matchmakers. Finally, when someone came to the matchmaker, she must be able to pick out a matching suitor according to her knowledge of local residents. Normally, a perfect couple had similar social status, economic status, and age. Wealthy families would look for a bride of similar social status who could manage the family finances and, most importantly, produce sons to inherit the family's wealth. Poor families, on the other hand, would not be as demanding and would only look for a bride who is willing to work hard in the fields. Sometimes they even needed to travel to neighboring towns for a match, hence the verse "Traveling to the east household, traveling to the west household, their feet are always busy and their voices are always loud." Furthermore, mediators were required to know simple mathematics and characters in order to write the matrimonial contract. The contract included "the sum of the bride price, the identity and age of both partners, and the identity of the person who presided over the wedding ceremony, usually the parents or grandparents."

Matchmakers made a living not only by facilitating successful marriage arrangements, but also by delivering messages between the two families. When they visited the households to deliver messages, the hosts usually provided them food and drinks to enjoy, hence the verse "Asking for a cup of tea, asking for a cup of alcohol, their faces are 3.3 inches thick (they are really cheeky)." However, these "visiting payments" were tiny compared to the payment they received for a successful marriage. The visiting payment was always measured by "wen" or cash, whereas the final payment was measured by "liang" or taels. (One tael was equivalent to a thousand wen.) Therefore, the matchmakers would spend most of their time travelling back and forth between the two households to persuade them to marry. In addition, the matchmakers received payments for introducing young girls to wealthy men. In Zhang Dai's short essay collection The Dream Collection of Tao'an (Tao'an Meng Yi), he described a scene in which matchmakers brought young beautiful girls to the houses of wealthy customers to choose. Even if the customer was not satisfied, he would reward the matchmaker with several hundred wen.

As marriage matchmakers, these grannies also possessed "guilty knowledge" of secret affairs. In The Golden Lotus (Jin Ping Mei), the matchmaker Wang speculated that Ximen Qing was fond of the married woman Pan Jinlian, so she introduced Pan to Ximen, helped them to have an affair and then hide the secret for them. According to the law, married woman had to be loyal to her husband, and anyone who discovered a woman who had an affair should report her immediately. Matchmakers were licensed to keep secrets about affairs because keeping privacy of their clients was their obligation. Even so, they were usually criticized for doing so. In The Golden Lotus, Wang was blamed for encouraging ladies to have improper affairs.

=== Marriage matters in Xinjiang (1880–1949) ===
Even though Muslim women are forbidden to marry non-Muslims in Islamic law, from 1880 to 1949, it was frequently violated in Xinjiang since Chinese men married Muslim Turki (Uyghur) women. Turki women who married Chinese were labelled as whores by the Turki community; these marriages were illegitimate according to Islamic law. Turki women obtained benefits from marrying Chinese men since the Chinese defended them from Islamic authorities. These women were not subjected to the tax on prostitution and were able to save their income for themselves.

Chinese men gave their Turki wives privileges which Turki men's wives did not have, The wives of Chinese men did not have to wear a veil. A Chinese man in Kashgar once beat a mullah who tried to force his Turki Kashgari wife to veil. Turki women also were not subjected to any legal binding to their Chinese husbands and they could make their Chinese husbands provide them with as much money as she wanted for her relatives and herself, since the women could leave when she wanted to. Any property the Chinese men owned was left to their Turki wives after they died.

Because they were viewed as "impure", Islamic cemeteries banned Turki wives of Chinese men from being buried within them. Turki women got around this problem by giving shrines donations to buy a grave in other towns. Besides Chinese men, other men such as Armenians, Jews, Russians, and Badakhshanis intermarried with local Turki women.

Local Turki society accepted the Turki women and Chinese men's mixed offspring as their own people, despite the marriages being in violation of Islamic law. Turki women also conducted temporary marriages with Chinese soldiers temporarily stationed around them. Frequently, when the soldier's time at the post ended, they would sell their wives and daughters to other Chinese soldiers stationed nearby, taking their sons with them if they could afford to, abandoning them if they could not.

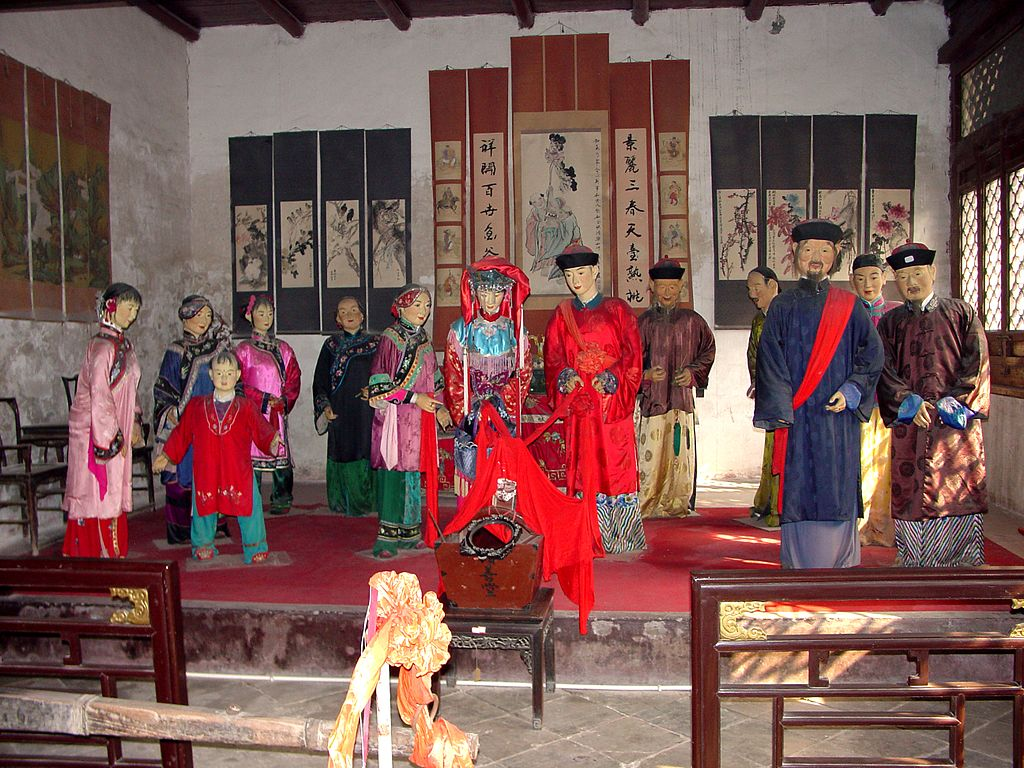
The bride and groom get married in the presence of their relatives, friends, and the matchmaker.

== Traditional marriage rituals ==
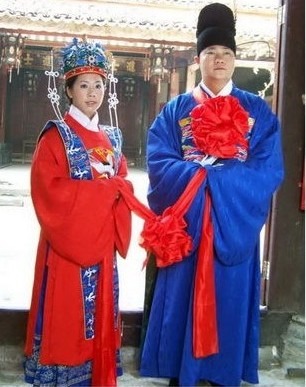
A modern wedding held in a Ming dynasty format

Chinese marriage became a custom between 402 and 221 BC. Despite China's long history and many different geographical areas, there are essentially six rituals, generally known as the three letters and six etiquettes (三書六禮). Unfortunately for some traditional families, the wife's mother cannot go to her son-in-law's family until one year (according to the Chinese lunar calendar or Chinese Lunar New Year) after the wedding has elapsed. However, during this one year, the daughter can go back at any time.

=== Six etiquettes ===
The wedding ceremony consisted of six basic procedures: making a proposal of marriage (nacai), requesting the bride's name and date of birth (wenming), sending news of divination results and betrothal gifts (naji), sending wedding presents to the bride's house (nazheng), requesting the date of the wedding (qingqi), and fetching the bride in person (qinying). Details of each ritual could vary.

1. Proposal: After an unmarried boy's parents found a potential daughter-in-law, they located a matchmaker to assuage any conflict of interests and general embarrassments when discussing the possibility of marriage between the two families, previously largely unknown to each other. Marriages were chosen based upon the needs of reproduction and honor, as well as the need of the father and husband.
2. Birthdates: If the selected girl and the boy and her parents did not object to the proposal, the matchmaker would match the birthdates (Chinese: 秊庚八字; pinyin: niángēng bāzì; lit. 'the 8 cyclic characters for year', 'month', 'day and hour of birth of a man', 'which determine his fate') in which suan ming (Chinese fortune telling) is used to predict the future of that couple-to-be. If the result was good, they would then go to the next step, submitting the bride's price.
3. Bridewealth (betrothal gifts): At this point the bridegroom's family arranged for the matchmaker to present a bride price (betrothal gifts), including the betrothal letter, to the bride's family.
4. Wedding gifts: The groom's family would then send an elaborate array of food, cakes, and religious items to the bride's family.
5. Arranging the wedding: Before the wedding ceremony, the two families would arrange a wedding day according to Chinese tung shing. Selecting an auspicious day to assure a good future for the couple was as important as avoiding an unlucky day. In some cases, there were no auspicious dates, and the couple would have to review their potential date range.
6. Wedding ceremony: The final ritual would be the actual wedding ceremony where bride and groom become a married couple. This consisted of many elaborate parts:
  - Wedding procession: Before the meeting, the bride would be helped by a respectable old woman to tie up her hair with colourful cotton threads. She would wear a red skirt, to symbolize happiness. When the party arrived, the bride must cry with her mother to symbolize her reluctance to leave home. She would then be led or carried by her elder brother to the sedan. From here, the wedding procession from the bride's home to the groom's home consisted of a traditional band, the bride's sedan, the maid of honors sedans (if there were maids of honor), and bride's dowry in forms other than money. The most common dowries included scissors, like two butterflies never separating, rulers, indicating acres of fields, and vases for peace and wealth.
  - Welcoming the bride: The wedding procession of the bride's family stopped at the door of the groom's home. In the meeting party, the groom would have to overcome a series of challenges, such as games, obstacles, riddles or the like, intentionally set in his path. Only after coping with these could he pass to see his wife-to-be.
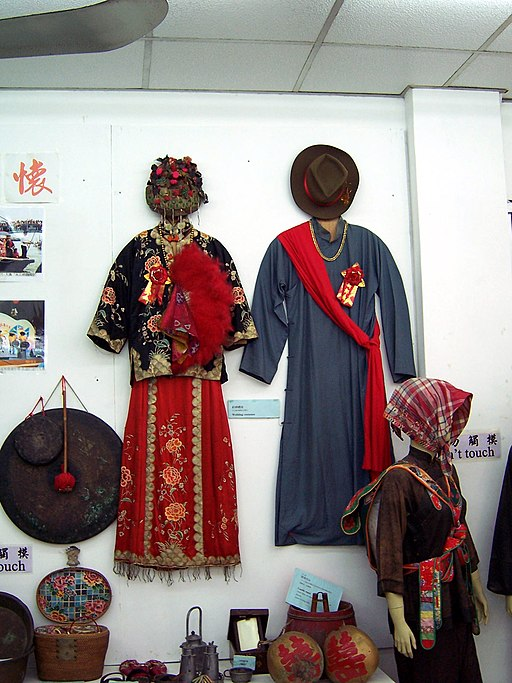
    Traditional Chinese wedding dresses
  - Actual wedding ceremonies: On the arrival of the sedan to the wedding place, there would be music and firecrackers. The bride would be led along the red carpet in a festive atmosphere. The groom, also in a red gown, would kowtow three times to worship the heaven, parents and spouse. Equivalent to exchanging vows in the west, the couple would pay respect to the Jade Emperor, the patron family deities (or patron buddhas and bodhisattvas), to deceased ancestors, the bride and groom's parents and other elders, and to each other. Then, the new couple would go to their bridal chamber and guests would be treated to a feast.
  - Wedding banquet: In Chinese society, the wedding banquet is known as xǐ-jǐu (喜酒; 'joyful wine'), and is sometimes far more important than the actual wedding itself. There are ceremonies where the bride presented wines or tea to parents, guests, and their spouse. In modern weddings, the bride generally picks red (following Chinese tradition) or white (more Western) for the wedding. Traditionally, the groom is not responsible for the cost of the wedding invitation sweet treats (often pastries), the banquet invitations, or the wedding itself. Wedding banquets were elaborate and usually consisted of 5–10 courses, with ingredients such as shark fin, abalone, lobster, squab, sea cucumber, swift nests or fish roe in soup or as decoration on top of a dish to symbolize fertility. Local delicacies would also be served. Traditionally, the father of the bride was responsible for the wedding banquet hosted on the bride's side and the alcohol consumed during both banquets. There were two separate wedding banquets: the primary banquet was hosted on the bride's side, the second, smaller banquet was held on the groom's side. While the wedding itself was often based on the couple's choices, the wedding banquets were a gesture of thanks and appreciation to those that have raised the bride and groom. It was also to ensure the relatives on each side met each other. Thus, out of respect for the elders, wedding banquets were usually done formally and traditionally, in order for the older generations to feel more comfortable. On the night of the wedding day, in some places, it was customary for relatives or friends to banter the newlyweds. Though this seemed a little noisy, this behavior was to cause the bride and groom to stop being shy and become more familiar with each other. On the third day of the marriage, the new couple would go back to the bride's parents' home. There, they would be received with a dinner party including relatives (the smaller banquet).

== Modern practices ==
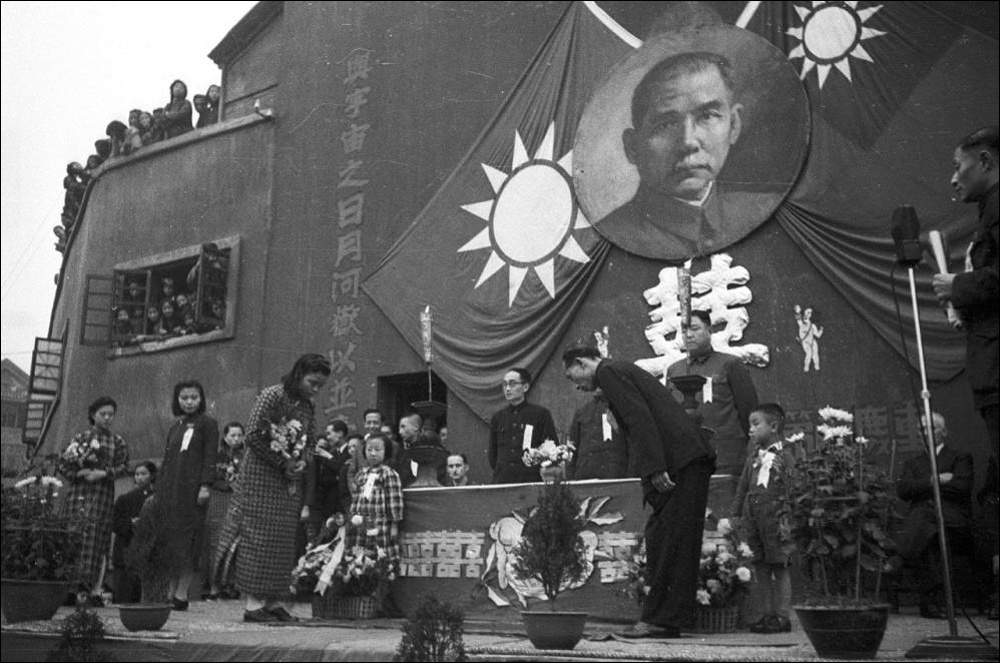
A collective wedding in Chungking in 1941 (Harrison Forman)

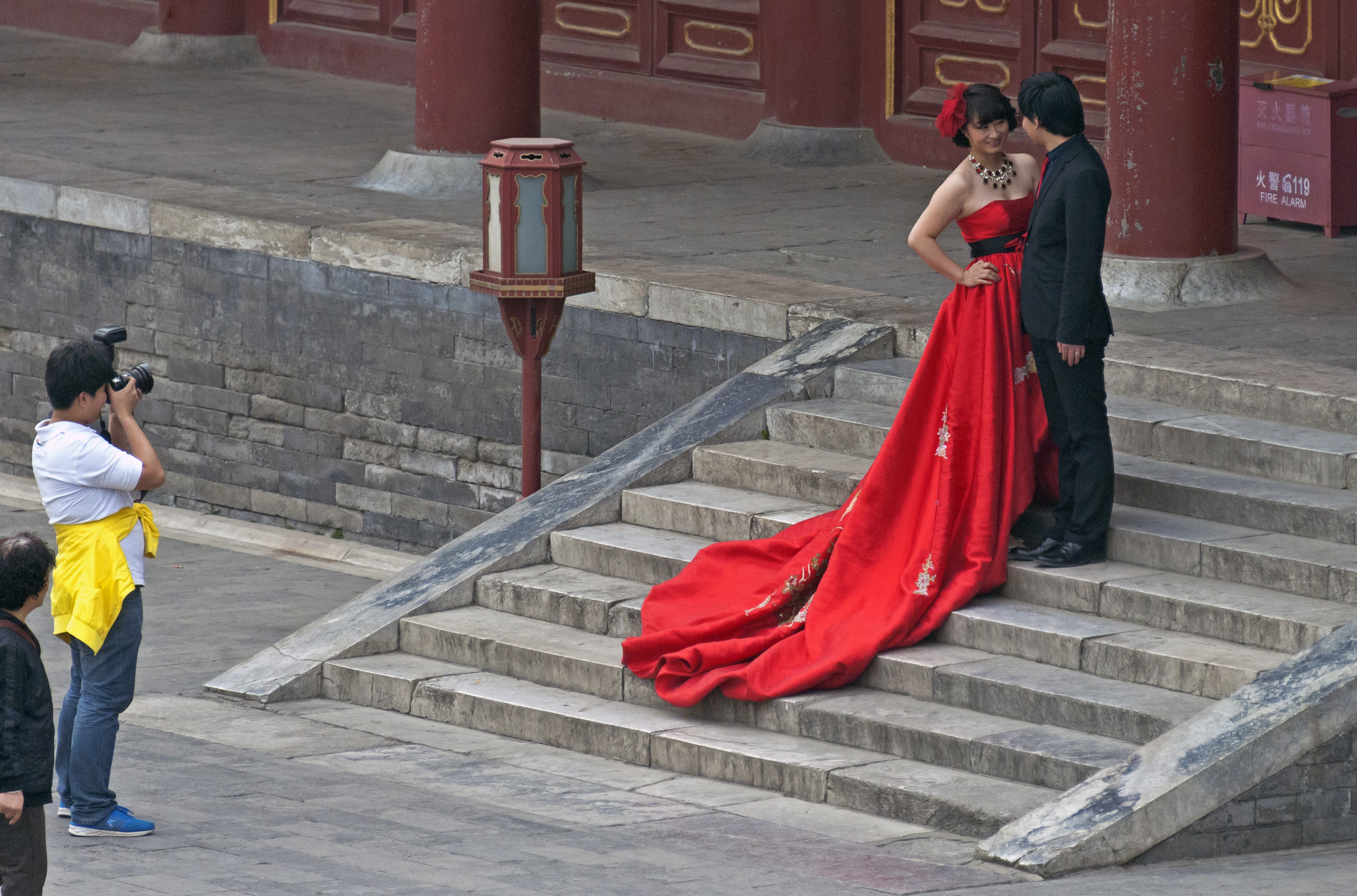
A couple, with the bride in a traditionally red dress, being photographed at the Temple of Heaven in Beijing

Since the late 1990s, it has become popular to create an elaborate wedding album, often taken at a photography studio. The album usually consists of many pictures of the bride and groom taken at various locations with many different outfits. In Singapore, these outfits often include wedding outfits belonging to different cultures, including Arab and Japanese wedding outfits. In contrast to Western wedding pictures, the Chinese wedding album will not contain pictures of the actual ceremony and wedding itself.

In Mandarin Chinese, a mang nian (盲年), or 'blind year', when there are no first days of spring, such as in year 2010, a Year of the Tiger, is considered an ominous time to marry or start a business. In the preceding year, there were two first days of spring.

In recent years, Confucian wedding rituals have become popular among Chinese couples. In such ceremonies, which are a recent innovation with no historic antecedent, the bride and groom bow and pay respects to a large portrait of Confucius hanging in the banquet hall while wedding attendants and the couple themselves are dressed in traditional Chinese robes.

Before the bride and groom enter the nuptial chambers, they exchange nuptial cups and perform ceremonial bows as follows:

1. first bow – Heaven and Earth
2. second bow – ancestors
3. third bow – parents
4. fourth bow – spouse

== Traditional divorce process ==
In traditional Chinese society, there are three major ways to dissolve a marriage.

The first was no-fault divorce. According to the Tang Code, the legal code of the Tang dynasty (618–907), a marriage may be dissolved due to personal incompatibility, provided that the husband writes a divorce note.

The second, (義絕) was through state-mandated annulment of marriage. This applied when one spouse committed a serious crime (variously defined, usually more broadly for the wife) against the other or his/her clan. If the couple did not take the initiative to divorce when the criminal annulment (義絕) situation arose, the state would intervene to force them to divorce. If one side refused to divorce, the law had to investigate the criminal liability of the party and give a one-year prison sentence. Once a divorce was judged, they must not be reunited.

The third way was by mutual divorce (和離). It was a way that both husband and wife could have the power to divorce. It required agreement between the two. This way of divorce was to ensure both husband and wife had equal power to protect themselves and their property. It also enhanced the concept of responsibility. Divorce was seen as a responsibility to each other and, the country or government would not typically intervene.

Last, the husband could unilaterally declare a divorce. To be legally recognized, it had to be based on one of the following seven reasons (七出):

- The wife lacks filial piety towards her parents-in-law (不順舅姑). This makes the parents-in-law potentially capable of breaking a marriage against both partners' wills.
- She fails to bear a son (無子).
- She is vulgar or lewd/adulterous (淫).
- She is jealous (妒). This includes objecting to her husband taking an additional wife or concubine.
- She has a vile disease (有惡疾).
- She is gossipy (口多言).
- She commits theft (竊盜).

There are, however, three clearly defined exceptions (三不去), under which unilateral divorce was forbidden, despite the presence of any of the seven aforementioned grounds:

- She has no family to return to (有所取無所歸).
- She had observed a full, three-year mourning for a parent-in-law (與更三年喪).
- Her husband was poor when they married, and is now rich (前貧賤後富貴).

The above law about unilateral divorce was in force from the Tang dynasty up to its final abolition in the Republic of China's Civil Code (Part IV) Section 5, passed in 1930.

== Divorce in contemporary China ==
After the establishment of the People's Republic in 1949, the country's new Marriage Law also explicitly provided for lawful divorces. Women were permitted to divorce their husbands and many did, sparking resistance especially from rural males. Kay Ann Johnson reported that tens of thousands of women in north central China were killed for seeking divorces or committed suicide when blocked from doing so.

Divorce was rare during the Mao era (1949–1976), but it has become easier and more commonplace in the post-reform era. A USC U.S.-China Institute article reports that the divorce rate in 2006 was about 1.4/1000 people, about twice what it was in 1990 and more than three times what it was in 1982. Still, the divorce rate in China is less than half of that in the United States. One of the most important breakthroughs in the marriage institution were amendments added to the Marriage Law in 2001, which shortened the divorce-application procedure and added legitimate reasons for divorce, including emphasizing the importance of faithfulness within a married couple. A response to rising failure of marriages due to unfaithful affairs during marriages has come into public knowledge. With rising divorce rates, public discussions and governmental organs often criticize the lack of effort in marriage maintenance which many couples express. This is evident, for example in the new 'divorce buffer zones' established in the marriage registration offices in certain provinces, which is a room where the couples wait, typically 30 days as a stage within the divorce application procedure, and are encouraged to talk things over and consider giving their marriage another chance. However, such phenomena has not decreased divorce rates in China.

Amendments have also been made to Article 32 of the revised 2001 Marriage Law. Parties to a marriage can apply for divorce under, and by showing, the following grounds:

- Bigamy or a married person cohabiting with a third party;
- Domestic violence or maltreatment and desertion of one family member by another;
- Bad habits of gambling or drug addiction that remain incorrigible despite repeated admonition;
- Separation caused by incompatibility, which lasts two full years;
- Any other circumstances causing alienation of mutual affection.

== Monogamy ==
In ancient China, a woman's social status was not as good as a man's. A woman could only obey and rely on her husband. She shared her husband's class, whether he was a peasant, merchant, or official. The clothes she could wear and the etiquette she was expected to display depended on her husband's background and achievements. If her husband was dead, she could remarry, but would be seen as not decent. The neo-Confucian opposition to widow remarriage was expressed in an oft-quoted aphorism of Zhu Xi: "It is a small matter to starve to death, but a large matter to lose one's virtue." Moreover, the government also issued measures against widow remarriage. For example, "The state reinforced the neo-Confucian attitude against widow remarriage by erecting commemorative arches to honour women who refused to remarry. In 1304, the Yuan government issued a proclamation declaring that all women widowed before they were thirty who remained chaste widows until they were fifty were to be so honoured. The Ming and Qing continued the practice."

The virtues of chaste widowhood were extolled by instructions for women, such as the Nu Lun Yu (Analects for Women). While a man could have though only one wife but many concubines and marry someone else a new wife if the wife died before him. The general dignitaries also had only one wife but many concubines.

=== Sororate marriage ===
Sororate marriage is a custom in which a man marries his wife's sister(s). Later it is expanded to include her cousins or females from the same clan. The Chinese name is 妹媵 (妹=younger sister, 媵=co-bride/concubinage). It can happen at the same time as he marries the first wife, at a later time while the wife is still alive, or after she dies. This practice occurred frequently among the nobility of the Zhou dynasty (1045–256 BC), with cases occurring at later times.

=== Multiple wives with equal status ===
- Emperors of some relatively minor dynasties are known to have multiple empresses.
- Created by special circumstances. For example, during wartime a man may be separated from his wife and mistakenly believe that she had died. He remarries, and later the first wife is found to be alive. After they are reunited, both wives may be recognized.
- Qianlong Emperor of Qing dynasty began to allow polygamy for the specific purpose of siring heirs for another branch of the family (see Levirate marriage). Called "multiple inheritance" (兼祧), if a man is the only son of his father 單傳, and his uncle has no son, then with mutual agreement, he may marry an additional wife. A male child from this union becomes the uncle's grandson and heir. The process can be repeated for additional uncles.

Besides the traditional desire for male children to carry on the family name, this allowance partially resolves a dilemma created by the emperor himself. He had recently banned all non-patrilineal forms of inheritance, while wanting to preserve the proper order in Chinese kinship. Therefore, a couple without a son cannot adopt one from within the extended family. They either have to adopt from outside (which was regarded by many as passing the family wealth to unrelated "outsiders"), or become heirless. Multiple inheritance marriages provided a way out when the husband's brother has a son.

=== Ruzhui marriage ===
The custom of ruzhui (入贅) applied when a relatively wealthy family had no male heirs, and a poorer family had multiple male children. Under these circumstances, a male from the poorer family, generally a younger sibling, will marry into the wealthier family in order to continue their family line. In a ruzhui (lit., 'the [man] becoming superfluous') marriage, the children would take on the surname of the wife.

=== Concubinage ===
In ancient China, concubinage was very common, and men who could afford it usually bought concubines and took them into their homes in addition to their wives. The standard Chinese term translated as "concubine" means "concubine: my and your servant." In the family hierarchy, the principal wife (diqi) ranked second only to her husband, while a concubine was always inferior to the wife, even if her relations with the husband were more intimate. Women in concubinage (妾) were treated as inferior, and expected to be subservient to the wife (if there was one). The women were not wedded in a formal ceremony, had less rights in the relationship, and could be divorced arbitrarily. They generally came from lower social status or were bought as slaves.

Women who had eloped may have also become concubines since a formal wedding requires her parents' participation.

The number of concubines was sometimes regulated, and differed according to the man's rank. In ancient China, men of higher social status often supported several concubines, and Chinese emperors almost always had dozens, or even hundreds, of royal concubines.

=== Polyandry ===
Polyandry is the practice of a woman having multiple husbands. It was not rare in traditional Chinese society, especially among the wealthy elite, and it was legal in Hong Kong until as recently as 1971. A compendium of miscellaneous facts compiled in the Ming dynasty (1368–1644) mentioned a coastal village in present-day Zhejiang province called Shoujin'ao, where it was customary for brothers to marry the same woman. In fact, the wife preferred this arrangement for reasons of financial security. With a handkerchief hung outside the bedroom door, the husbands indicated whose turn it was to have conjugal relations.

In Yunan, Pumi society has been traditionally organized into exogamous clans with marriages arranged by the parents. Marriage between cross-cousins and marriage within the clan is prohibited. Today there is a great variety of marriage patterns and styles, with intermarriage to other ethnic groups common in some areas while not so common in others. Some polyandry exists among the Pumi. Those that live near the Mosuo have adopted some of their marriage customs. Generally marriage is patrilocal, with men inheriting property, except in the area around Mosuo-dominated Lugu Lake and Yongning where the Pumi seem to have adopted the Mosuo practice of the 'walking marriage' where husbands visit their his wife's home at night but return to their maternal home in the day to work. Also, where Pumi live alongside Mosuo, it is not unusual for the two groups to intermarry. Fraternal polyandry in Tibet is widely considered to be a means of preventing the division of a family's resources among its male heirs. As a family resource preservation strategy, Tibetan polyandry accomplishes the same goal as European family system, but in a very different way. Researchers have suggested that polyandry developed in Tibet, because it; provides a household with enough male laborers to fully exploit the marginal agricultural lands in the Himalayas, that it serves as a means of population control, or that it serves as a way of reducing tax obligations to feudal Tibetan lords. A more convincing explanation of why Tibetan polyandry is practiced is provided by Nancy E. Levine. She claims that polyandry provides a household with a large labor force, enabling the family to pursue simultaneous and extensive involvement in the three sectors of Tibetan economy: agriculture, herding, and trading (1988). Since Tibetan polyandry provides such important economic advantages to households, one can assume that the reason for the dissolution of polyandrous marriages is largely for individual interests. Levine (1981) and Melvyn C. Goldstein (1981) find that the breakup of polyandrous marriages is usually caused by the younger brothers of the household, due to unhappiness with their spouse, their lower reproductive success than older brothers, a desire for personal autonomy, or difficulty in maintaining a large household. Goldstein (1981) also finds that brothers are more likely to leave polyandrous marriages when unexpected economic opportunities arise.

== See also ==
- Confucian view of marriage
- Wedding reception in Chinese societies
- Traditional Chinese wedding dress
- Jiaobeijiu
- ghost marriage in China

== See also ==
- Chinese culture
- Chinese social relations
- New Marriage Law
- Palanquin
- Red envelope
- Shanghai marriage market
