= Mary Hannah Fulton =

American physician and missionary (1854–1927)

Mary Hannah Fulton (31 May 1854 – 7 January 1927) was a medical missionary sent to South China by the Presbyterian Church. She began her work by setting up a dispensary in Kwai Ping, then continued by working with the Canton Hospital. She set up a college to train women in medicine, the Hackett Medical College for Women, and served as the dean there. In addition, she preached the Presbyterian faith and ultimately began a multi-denominational Christian congregation in Shanghai. There she also translated English medical volumes into Chinese. She died in Pasadena, California at the age of 72.

== Early life and education ==
Mary Hannah Fulton was born in Ashland, Ohio on May 31, 1854. She was born to John S. Fulton, a native Pennsylvanian and prominent attorney in Ohio, and Augusta Louise Fulton, a native of Seneca, New York. Her parents moved to Ashland in 1840, and her father was a prominent attorney there. Fulton had two brothers; Reverend Albert Andrew Fulton and Harmon H. Fulton. Fulton attended Lawrence University in Appleton, Wisconsin, where she completed her freshman and sophomore years. She completed her education and received her B.S. degree in 1874 at Hillsdale College, and then received her M.S. degree in 1877 from the same college. After teaching in the public schools of Indianapolis, Indiana for three years, Fulton entered the Woman’s Medical College of Pennsylvania, which was noted for training medical missionaries. She graduated in the spring of 1884. Her graduation thesis was written on the topic of Elephantiasis Gracecorum-leprosy, a disease especially common in central and southern China.

== Early work in China ==
=== Work in the Guangxi Province ===
The Presbyterian Church began their missionary missions to China in 1838. Fulton was appointed as a missionary to South China in May 1884 by the Presbyterian Board of Foreign Missions. Upon arrival, Fulton joined her brother and his wife in their quest to evangelize China. Together, they set up an outpost in Kwai Ping in the Guangxi province, an anti-foreigner region where no missionaries had previously ventured. Mary Fulton rented two rooms in a mud house that served as a dispensary for medication and a treatment room, while Albert Fulton preached and his wife opened a school for girls. In order to communicate with the locals, Fulton hired an assistant, Mrs. Mei Yagui, who had trained at the Canton Hospital, to serve as her translator and assistant. By 1886, Mary and Albert Fulton had succeeded in raising the funds necessary to build a new hospital building. However, before the opening, a violent gang attacked the missionary outpost, incited by Confucian scholars who were against the mutilation of human bodies for the sake of medicine. The missionaries escaped without serious injury, but never again returned to Kwai Ping. That same year, the Medical Missionary Association of China was founded in Shanghai. Fulton was admitted as one of the original thirty-four members.

=== Canton Hospital ===
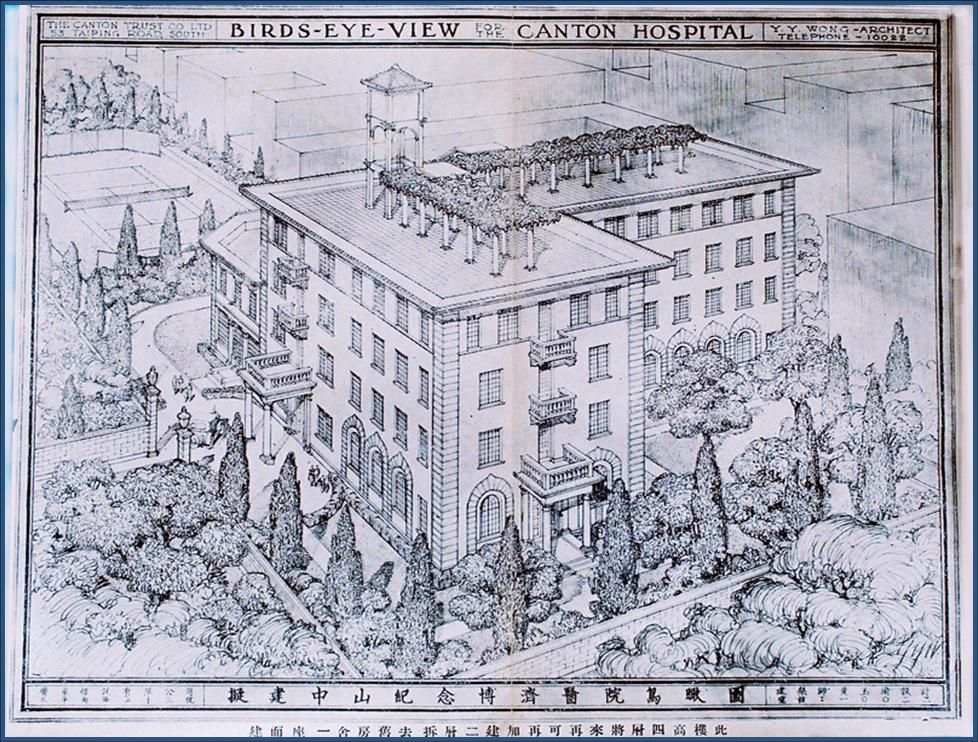
Birds Eye view of the Canton Hospital, in Guangzhou, China.

Fulton continued her work at the Canton Hospital, which was started by Dr. Peter Parker in 1835 and run by John G Kerr and later John M. Swan. The Canton Hospital, a treatment and training facility, also ran dispensaries in the area. In 1888, Fulton opened a dispensary for women near the hospital. In 1891, she opened another dispensary for women with the help of Dr. Mary Niles. She used these dispensaries to provide medical treatment to villagers who were not able to travel to the hospital.

Fulton performed medical services ranging from regular treatment to common surgical operations free of charge to those who could not pay. When patients insisted on paying her, citing Chinese tradition, she used the gifts to support the patients’ families, and cash was contributed to the hospital. In 1879, John G. Kerr admitted two women to the training program at the Canton Hospital. By 1888 there were 37 female pupils training at the hospital. In 1897, Fulton resumed responsibility for the women’s work of the hospital. When Kerr resigned from the hospital in 1898, no provisions were made for the female students. Fulton began collecting funds at once to set up training for women medical professionals.

== Hackett Medical College for Women ==
=== Necessity for a women’s college ===
Due to the strict social etiquette in China that forbade physical contact between men and women, women were reluctant to consult doctors or receive medical treatment. A male practitioner could not even put a finger on a female’s wrist to feel a pulse; women pointed to a figurine to show where their pain was instead of point to a body part or removing pieces of clothing. Therefore, there was a high demand for female medical professionals who would be able to treat women and girls.

=== Facilities ===
Fulton opened her first training facility, called the Kwangtung Medical School for Women, in 1901. It was housed on the ground floor of the Theodore Cuyler First Presbyterian Church in the western suburbs of Canton and consisted of 11 female students. The building was not sufficient as the students were forced to have their meals in the outpatient room. With three thousand dollars raised by the Fulton and Presbyterian mission, a special hospital for women and children, called the David Gregg Hospital, was built as a teaching facility for the school. Theodore Cuyler and David Gregg were pastors of the Lafayette Avenue Presbyterian Church in Brooklyn, New York, which commissioned and underwrote much of Fulton's work in China. In 1903, Mr E A Hackett donated enough money to build a special building to house the college, and it was renamed the Hackett Medical College for Women. Three years later, in 1906, another gift from Hackett allowed a second building to be built to house lecture and laboratory rooms. The first building became dorms.

=== Fulton’s impact ===
The goal of the college was to distribute Christianity and modern medicine, as well as to elevate the social status of women in China. With Fulton’s recommendation, the curriculum was taught in Cantonese in order to train women to be most effective to the surrounding areas and provide them with greater professional opportunities. The curriculum included attending clinics, helping to lance boils, and practical assistance in childcare and delivering babies. Graduates were instantly employed at mission hospitals and several government institutions. The graduates include Lee Sun Chau. Under Fulton’s guidance, Hackett College provided free medical services to the poor. The women who were trained at the Hackett College were considered fine educated women, and thus highly demanded as wives for the upper class. Therefore, Fulton made a strict restriction that women set to be married were prohibited from studying there. Fulton directed the college until 1915 when she moved to Shanghai; by then more than 60 women had graduated.

== Retirement to Shanghai ==
At the request of the Medical Missionary Association of China, Fulton moved to Shanghai in 1915 to commence the translation of medical books. She presented the Publication Committee of the Chinese Medical Society with a supply of her translation, which included Dr. Anna M. Fullerton’s “Nursing in Abdominal Surgery and Disease of Women” as well as “Diseases of Children” and “Nursing in Abdominal Surgery”. Many Chinese general practitioners and medical teachers adopted her Cantonese translations of important English-language textbooks on general and surgical nursing.

In Shanghai, Fulton organized an independent congregation that included nine denominations. She raised money to build the Cantonese Union Church of Shanghai, also called the Augusta Fulton Memorial Church in memory of her mother. This became the center for Christian activities in Shanghai.

== Death ==
In May 1918, poor health forced Fulton to return to the United States. She died in Pasadena, California at the age of 72, and was buried in the Inglewood Cemetery in California. Her death was attributed to cardiac decomposition, the result of chronic asthma.

== Bibliography ==
- Chen, Deborah (2004). "The Establishment of Medical Missionary Education in Guangzhou." Thesis. Haverford College
- Barr, Jennifer (May 2012). A Guide to Materials on Western Medicine in China in the Collections of the Presbyterian Historical Society.. Philadelphia, Pennsylvania.
- James, Edward T. and Barbara Sicherman (1971). ‘' Notable American Women: A Biographical Dictionary '‘. Cambridge, MA: Belknap of Harvard UP.
- Wong, K. Chimin (1973). ‘' History of Chinese medicine; being a chronicle of medical happenings in China from ancient times to the present period'’ (2d ed.). New York: AMS Press.
- Xu, Guangqui (2011). American Doctors in Canton. New Brunswick, New Jersey: Transaction Publishers.
- Lovejoy, Esther (1957). Women Doctors of the World. Michigan: Macmillan.
