= Chinese rural left behind women =

The Chinese rural left behind women have emerged along with the rural population who has migrated in the country called internal migration after the reform and opening up in the early 1980s. Usually, the rural Chinese people that were "left behind" are women identified generally as the wives whose husbands migrated from rural areas for employment or to conduct business and having an absence of at least half a year.

These left behind women were also called left behind wives with a mean age of 38.29 years old. 82 percent of this population was aged from 31 to 45 years old It was estimated that the number of women left behind in Chinese rural areas is 47 to 50 million.

== Individual issues ==
=== Increasing workload ===
Usually, after rural men migrate in the cities, women left behind in the countryside have become the major labor force in Chinese agriculture. As a consequence, the new labour division which is simply identified as the "rural men migrate to cities while their wives are left behind to take care of the agriculture and the household" has emerged in China et al.).

Because women have been the only workforce in millions of farmer families as men's migration, besides agriculture work, these women also assumed a traditional workload, that was, doing housework, raising the children, providing care for the old people, and at the same time raising livestock and poultry to subsidize the family expenses. In addition, the divergent character of household land made it difficult to operate mechanized farming, which meant that the agricultural farming has to rely on elementary manual labor by women. Some survey in a south-western province showed that in the busy season, the women's mean work hours per day was 11 hours, among them, about 20% women had to work for more than 12 hours a day. Even in the free season, 58% of women had to work for more than 8 hours per day, 20% women more than 10 hours. Almost 80% of women reported there was no leisure time for them.

=== Physical and psychological problems ===
Chinese rural women left behind are increasingly affected by various social, economic, and demographic changes that directly or indirectly influence their health negatively. Many surveys on Chinese women left behind reported that majority of this population has been suffering physical health problems, including reproductive tract infection, maternity disease, occupational diseases, as well as high-risk of STIs or HIV/AIDS. For example, the extreme workload generated a lot of physical problems for these rural women. One study in eastern northwestern areas indicated that 60% women who were left behind were suffering the occupational diseases such as gastric disease, strain of lumbar muscles and lumbar diapophysis caused by heavy farming workload as reported.

The recent study has also alarmed that women left behind have been in a more dangerous health situation. It explained that migrant husband's return made their wives more possible to contract venereal diseases (Hu, 2007. One study (Dianmin, 2002, cited in)reported that between 1992 and 2002, migrants from the countryside accounted for 71% of all HIV-positive individuals in China. And another reported that when their husbands were HIV positive, married women left behind were also infected in one-third of the cases (Lurie, et al., 2003, cited in). The report from Gansu Province, the HIV infection number is increasing among women and the migrant population was identified as one of the main reasons for the increase in HIV.

With the addition of physical problem, all studies reported that women left behind have been suffering mental health problems. It was indicated by one central provincial survey that 70% of women reported suffering mental pressure, 30.8% has light or more than light mental problem. The national survey by China Agriculture University reported that 69.8% of women often feel fidgeting, 50.6% anxiety and 39% felt depressed. The studies stated that these mental problems have resulted from the extreme workload, the long-term sexual repression and the anxiety about the stability of marriage and family.

=== Lack of security in terms of marriage ===
Because the together time between the couples has been decreasing, and the discrepancy of urbanization level between genders has gradually extended which tended to induce the societal heterogeneity between genders larger, the possibility of divorce rate has been consequently increasing. One sample study in a county of one central province showed that 65% of the divorce cases in 2008 were involved with rural women who were left behind.

=== Lack of security in the community ===
Meantime, it was more likely for women left behind to be the victims of the crimes in the rural community where their husbands were absent. There were many extreme violent cases reported by the studies and newspapers, such as violent rape, robbery. Ding reposted in her survey that among sexual assault cases in the rural area, 62% of victims were women left behind, and 37% of the household left behind were the victims of the burglary.

== Social consequences of the feminization of agriculture ==
Feminization of agriculture refers to the emerging female labor in the agriculture industry, which is the vital characteristic of current agriculture in China. This population of women left behind becomes the major productive force in the agriculture industry of rural areas. It appears that the dominance of female agriculture across many rural areas in China is a "recent social phenomenon and represents a radical shift in work patterns". The data of the First Agricultural General Census (2000) showed that women made up 77.6 percent of the agricultural productive force.

=== Disadvantages ===
Generally, women left behind would take two strategies to handle the problems of the farm labor shortage and the over workload. Those are to rearrange the agricultural model and to reduce the domestic land acreage on the premise that the household food consumption has been met. They would grow the single-season food crop instead of the multi-season or switch the agricultural products from food crop with the characteristic of low-gain and large-acreage to a commercial product with high-profit.

It seems a trend that women have operated land with extensive cultivation model. This farming model has been always accompanied by frequent natural disasters and investment increasing. All these factors generated an agriculture industry with low quality and low profit. There was no wonder that rural women would like to leave the land uncultivated as considering these adversities. The situation of leaving the land uncultivated was identified as a new problem in current Chinese rural areas. Some researchers have already showed a great anxiety about that the feminization of agriculture would negatively affect the food supplies in the national side in the long term.

=== Current research ===
The first academic research in the nation which put left behind women as the main objective of the study did not come out until 2002. After that, some research articles were published in succession, et al.). These researches were dealing with the reasons of left behind, the current situation in terms of economic, social and marriage aspects, and the recommendations for this population's development. Although these topics were different, all findings in terms of this population's issues were similar.

In sum, the studies on women left behind indicated that these women did not benefit from economic growth and national reforms similarly to other sectors of society in the nation. On the contrary, they have been found to live in a more miserably adverse fortune.

== See also ==
- Women in agriculture in China
- Women in China
