= Women in China =

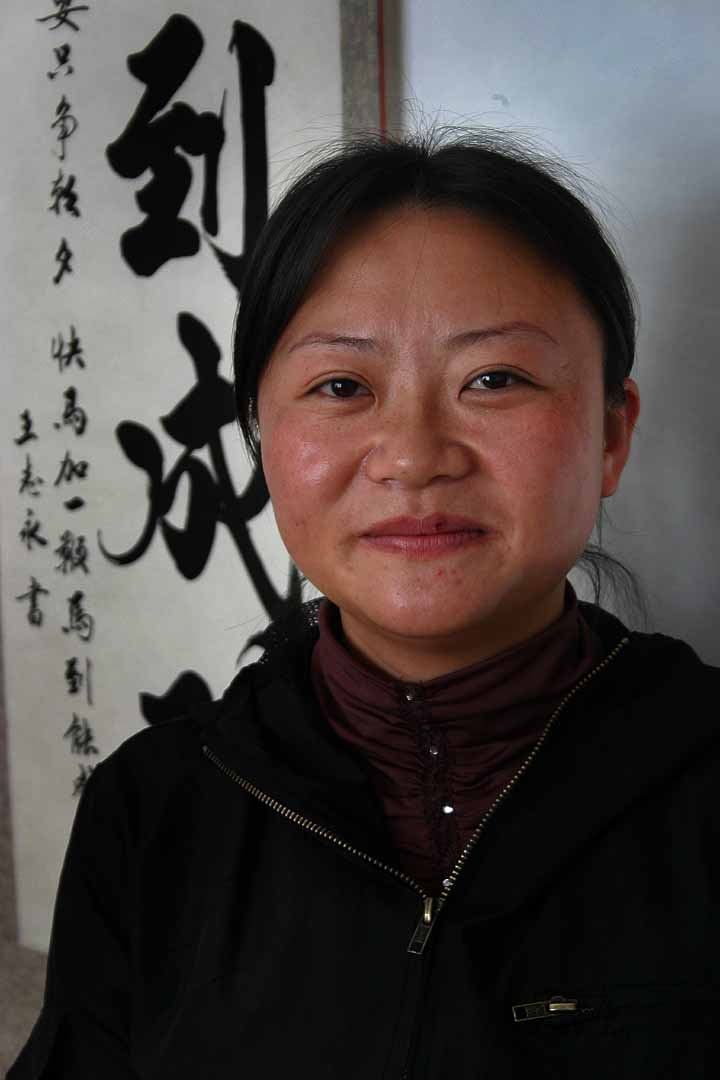
- Photo of a Chinese woman

General statistics
- Maternal mortality (per 100,000): 23 (2020)
- Women in parliament: 26.5% (2023)
- Women over 25 with secondary education: 54.8% (2010)
- Women in labour force: 59.6% (2024)

Gender Inequality Index
- Value: 0.192 (2021)
- Rank: 48th out of 191

Global Gender Gap Index
- Value: 0.699 (2026)
- Rank: 96th out of 146

Women in China make up approximately 49% of the population. (Note: For statistical purposes, the data for China do not include those for Hong Kong and Macau. Data exclude 2.3 million servicemen, 4.65 million persons with permanent resident status difficult to define, and 0.12 per cent undercount based on the post enumeration survey.) In modern China, the lives of women have changed significantly due to the late Qing dynasty reforms, the changes of the Republican period, the Chinese Civil War, and the People's Republic of China. Like women in many other cultures, women in China have been historically oppressed. For thousands of years, women in China lived under the patriarchal social order characterized by the Confucian teaching of "filial piety".

Achievement of women's liberation has been an agenda of the Chinese Communist Party (CCP) since the 1949 proclamation of the People's Republic of China. Following the Chinese Communist Revolution, Mao Zedong replaced the common use of the term "女人" [nüren] with "妇女" [funü] as he famously said "妇女能顶半边天" (Women hold up half the sky). "妇女" [funü] is a term for labouring women, which signifies the revolutionary role that women play in the liberation of China. The first celebration of "妇女节" (International Women's Day) in 1950 consolidated the representational strategies associated with the labouring women concept.

During the Mao era, many policies were carried out to promote gender equality. The New Marriage Law passed on May 1, 1950, outlawed forced marriage and concubinage. The last few regional practices of foot-binding died out, with the last case of foot-binding reported in 1957. The Great Leap Forward, while focusing on improving total productivity, created work opportunities for women. However, they still remained as peripheral roles and rarely climbed up to positions of decision-making. The representation of women as "iron women" who worked restlessly in workplaces dismissed the unalleviated domestic burden that women were still forced to take and homogenized the individuality of women. Women are systematically underrepresented in Chinese politics.

In contemporary China, although women's rights in China have improved tremendously, women still suffer a lower status compared with men. Under CCP general secretary Xi Jinping, China's ranking in the Global Gender Gap Report dropped from 69th place in 2012 to 102nd place in 2022, before rising back to 96th in 2026. After witnessing growing feminist movements in China, the Chinese government shut down many activist NGOs, detained feminists, and censored feminist platforms. Feminism has increasingly been viewed by many pro-government nationalists as a Western ideology. Xi Jinping has promoted pro-natalist policies and encouraged women to "actively foster a new type of marriage and childbearing culture." Abortion and divorce in China have been increasingly restricted in the 2020s.

== Historical development ==
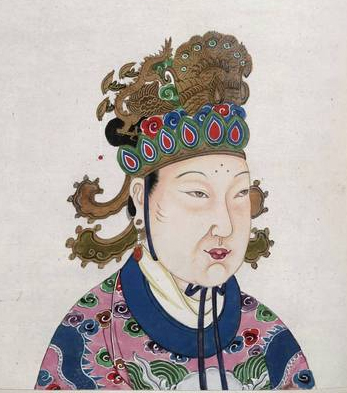
Empress Wu Zetian

=== Ancient and Imperial China ===
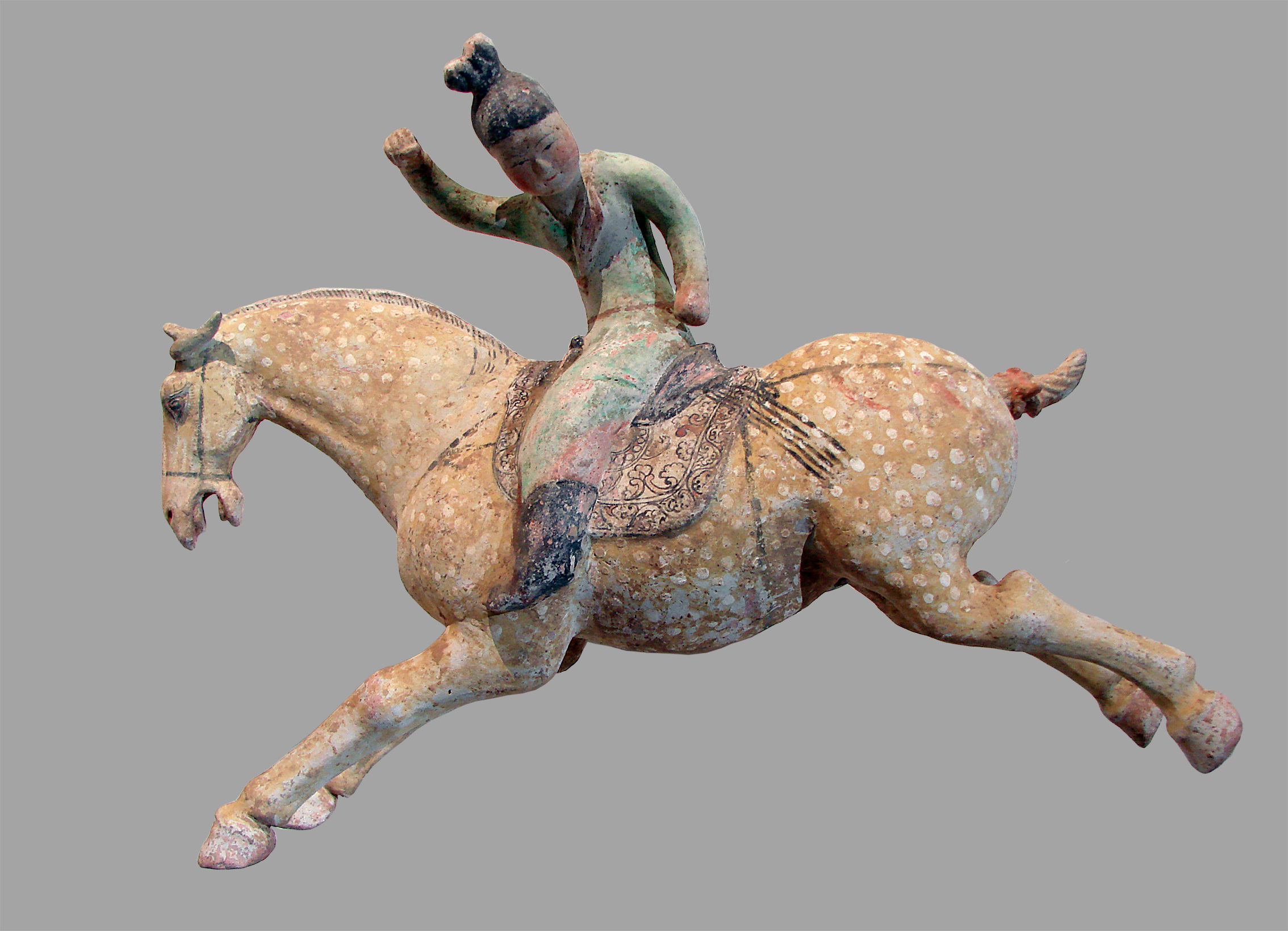
Young women playing polo (8th century, Tang Dynasty).

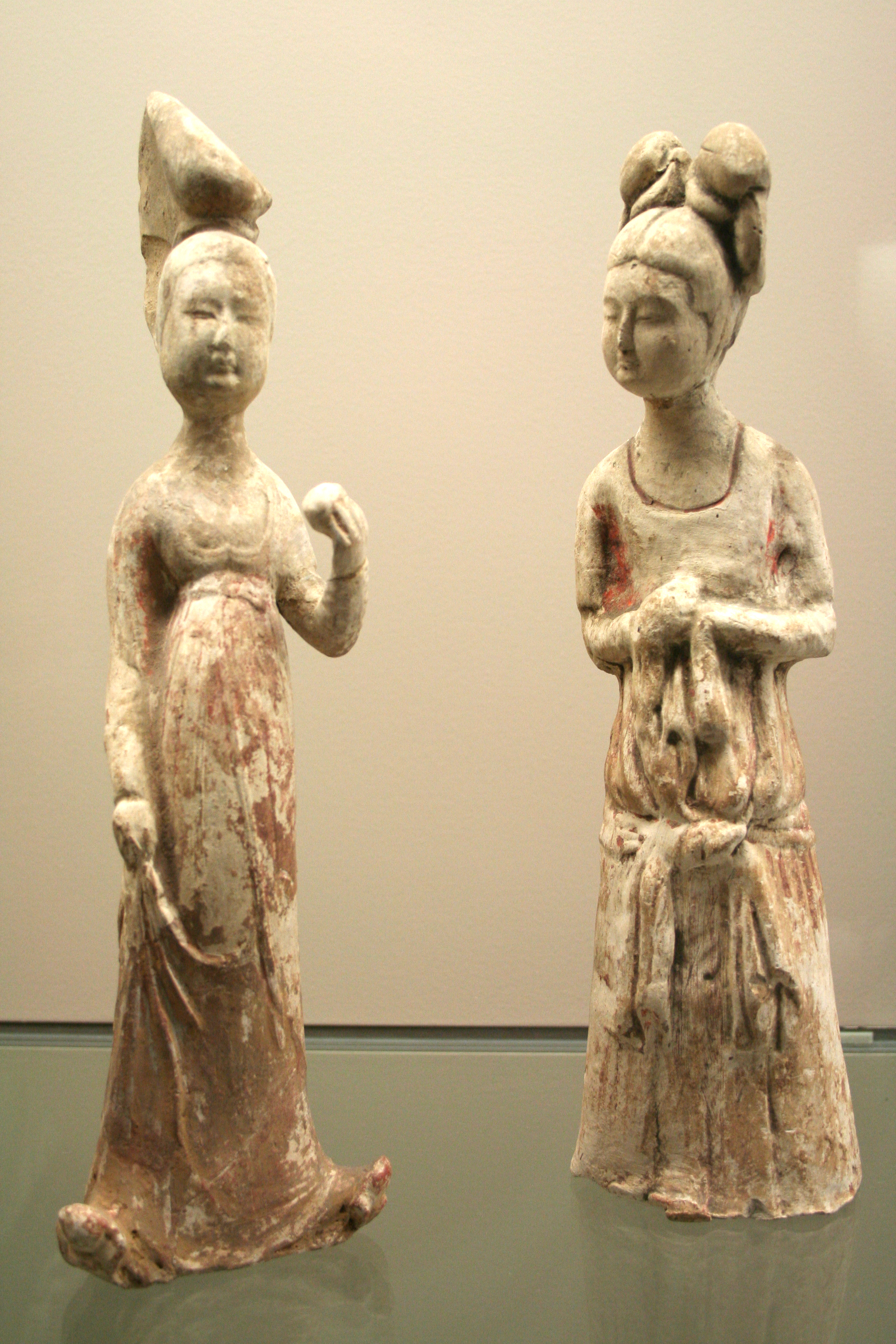
Figurines of women, Tang dynasty.

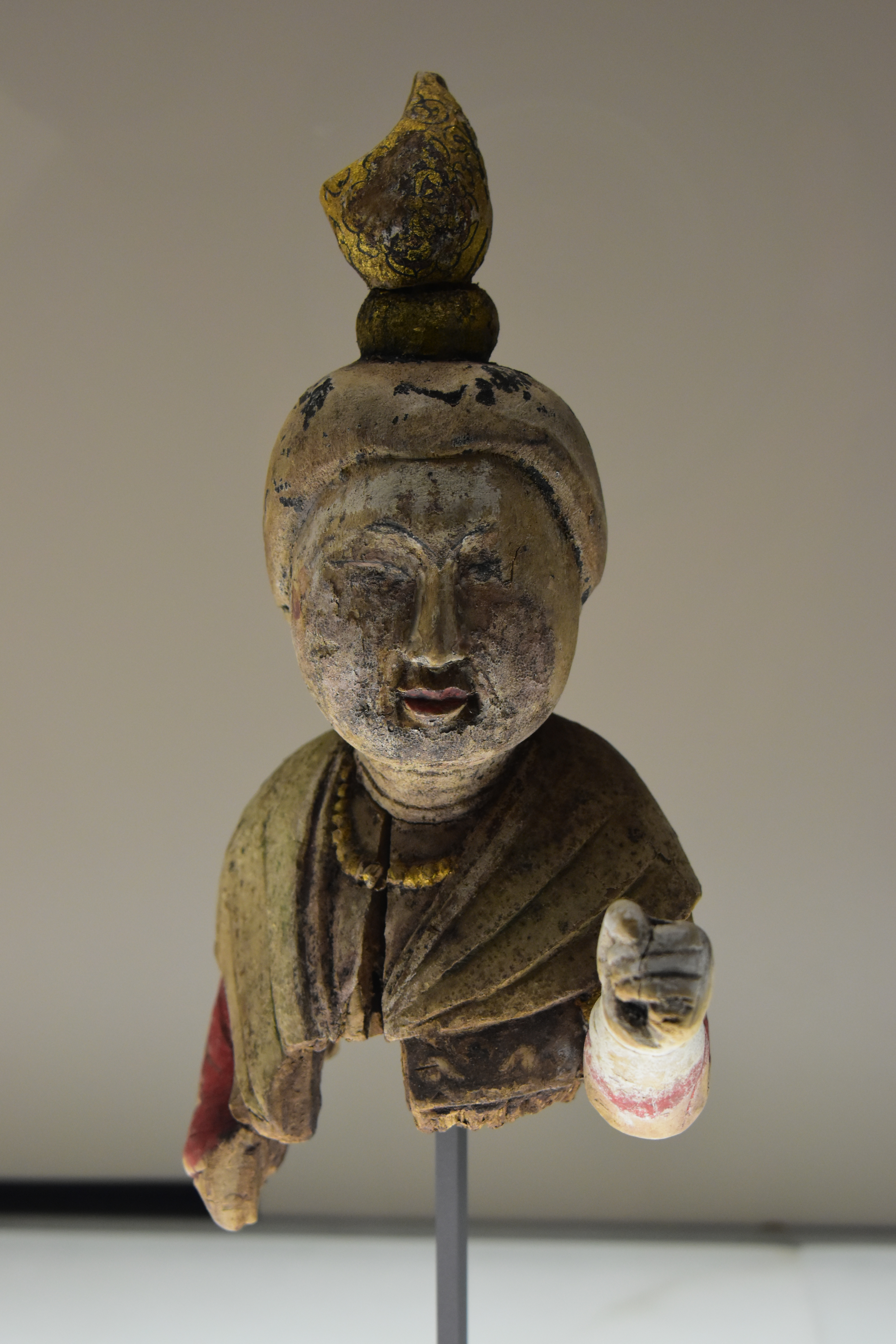
Polychrome bust of a woman, Tang dynasty.

Pre-modern Chinese society was predominantly patriarchal and patrilineal from the 11th century BC onward. The freedoms and opportunities available to women varied depending on the time period and regional situation. Women's status, like men's, was closely tied to the Chinese kinship system. From the ancient Chinese views, the family structure is the micro-system of the political system. Therefore, loyalty towards the Emperor is the same as the women inside the family who should obey their husbands to fulfilled the rule that had been set up for a long tradition. A prejudiced preference for sons has long existed in China, leading to high rates of female infanticide. There was also a strong tradition of restricting women's freedom of movement, particularly that of upper-class women, which manifested through the practice of foot binding. However, the legal and social status of women has greatly changed in the 20th century, especially in the 1970s, after the one-child and reform and opening up policies were enacted.

Older Chinese traditions surrounding marriage included many ritualistic steps. During the Han dynasty, a marriage lacking a dowry or betrothal gift was seen as dishonorable. Only after gifts were exchanged would a marriage proceed; and the bride would be taken to live in the ancestral home of the new husband. Here, a wife was expected to live with the entirety of her husband's family and to follow all of their rules and beliefs. Many families followed the Confucian teachings regarding honoring their elders. These rituals were passed down from father to son. Official family lists were compiled, containing the names of all the sons and wives. Brides who did not produce a son were written out of family lists. When a husband died, the bride was seen as the property of her spouse's family. Ransoms were set by some brides' families to get their daughters back, though never with her children, who remained with her husband's family.

According to classical patriarchal social mores, women should be quiet in public and not participate in public affairs. In the 1880s and 1890s, both male and female Chinese reformist intellectuals, concerned with the development of China to a modern country, raised feminist issues and gender equality in public debate; schools for girls were founded, a feminist press emerged, and the Foot Emancipation Society and Tian Zu Hui, promoting the abolition of foot binding.

In the late Qing dynasty period, extramarital sex by women and fornication (a label typically used to refer to pre-marital sex) by women were criminalized.

=== Developments in early 20th century ===
Traditional family structures, including a multi-generational household in which paternal grandmothers dominated household life, persisted into the early years of the Republic of China.

Early Reformers, including Liang Qichao, a scholar, journalist, and political reformer in the last years of the Qing dynasty, were one of the first in late imperial China to consider "the woman question".

Women increasingly participated in public affairs after the 1911 Revolution. In 1912 the Women's Suffrage Alliance, an umbrella organization of many local women's organizations, was founded to work for the inclusion of women's equal rights and suffrage in the constitution of the new republic after the abolition of the monarchy, and while the effort was not successful, it signified an important period of feminist activism.

May Fourth Movement discourses contrasted the idea of the "new woman" with that of the "traditional woman". The "new woman" reflected a secular world view, opposition to arranged marriage, and opposition to patriarchy. The idea of the "new woman" emphasized the urban and modern. May Fourth Movement discourses framed "traditional women" as rural, uneducated, and submitting to "feudal superstition".

In November 1919, Miss Zhao's suicide sparked cultural debate regarding the role of modern women in social and political life. A woman forced into an arranged marriage by her family, Miss Zhao, committed suicide by cutting her throat while being transported to the house of her would-be husband. The formerly routine occurrence of a woman's suicide to avoid arranged marriage became an important center of debate for Chinese feminists. Feminist commentators included Mao Zedong who published nine newspaper articles about the suicide and the need to overhaul societal norms relating to women. Simultaneously, Henrik Ibsen's play A Doll's House was newly translated and being performed in Shanghai. The example of the play's Nora further fueled radical intellectuals and the discussion of women's roles in China.

A generation of educated and professional new women emerged after the inclusion of girls in the state school system and after women students were acted at the University of Beijing in 1920, and in the 1931 Civil Code, women were given equal inheritance rights, banned forced marriage and gave women the right to control their own money and initiate divorce. No nationally unified women's movement organized until China was unified under the Kuomintang Government in Nanjing in 1928; women's suffrage was included in the new Constitution of 1936, although the constitution was not implemented until 1947.

Professor Lin Chun writes that "Women's liberation had been highlighted in the communist agenda from the outset, and, in that sense, the Chinese revolution was simultaneously a women's revolution, and Chinese socialism a women's cause." By the 1920s, the Communist movement in China used a labor and peasant organizing strategy that combined workplace advocacy with women's rights advocacy. The Communists would lead union organizing efforts among male workers while simultaneously working in nearby peasant communities on women's rights issues, including literacy for women. Mao Zedong and Yang Kaihui were among the most effective CCP political organizers using this method. Many women supported the CCP because of its emphasis on freedom of marriage, freedom to divorce, and its opposition to unfair treatment of women in the family. Poor peasant women were generally strong supporters of CCP programs.

During the White Terror that began with the 1927 Shanghai Massacre by the Kuomintang against the Communists, the Kuomintang specifically targeted women perceived as non-traditional. Kuomintang forces presumed that women who had short hair and whom had not been subjected to the practice of foot binding were radicals. Kuomintang forces cut their breasts off, shaved their heads, and displayed their mutilated corpses to cow the populace.

As part of Chiang Kai-shek's New Life Movement in Nationalist China, women were called to return to the home as virtuous wives and good mothers. The Movement's emphasis on women in the home was in part influenced by Nazi Germany and Fascist Italy's restraints on women's employment.

In the Chinese Civil War, the Communists enacted women's rights measures in areas of the country they controlled. Orders issued by the Red Army's soviet governments advanced the freedom to divorce and marry, liberating women from feudal marriages and resulting in women's strong support for the revolution. In the revolutionary base area of Jiangxi, the CCP-led authorities enacted the Marriage Regulations of 1931 and the Marriage Laws of 1941, which were modeled after Soviet Union statutes. These statutes declared marriage as a free association between a woman and a man without the interference of other parties and permitted divorce on mutual agreement. At the time, they were the most progressive marriage laws in China and created the conditions for women to divorce men they had been forced to marry, leave abusive spouses, and till their own land. Also during the Civil War, rural women were at the forefront of providing care to the dependents of men who fought in the Red Army, particularly through Women's Associations.

During China's land reform movement (which began after the defeat of the Japanese in the Second Sino-Japanese War and continued in the early years of the People's Republic of China), the CCP encouraged rural women in achieving a "double fanshen" - a revolutionary transformation as both a peasant and a feminist awakening as a woman. The CCP urged rural women to reject traditional Chinese assumptions about their role in society. In conjunction with land reform, the movement promoted women's issues such as the elimination of bride prices and reversing the stigma against widows remarrying. The CCP promoted successes in women's liberation, such as the progress of the Hui women of northwest China who were said to have not just received land through the rural movement, but also "freedom over their own bodies" and embraced political participation.

=== Developments in the People's Republic of China ===
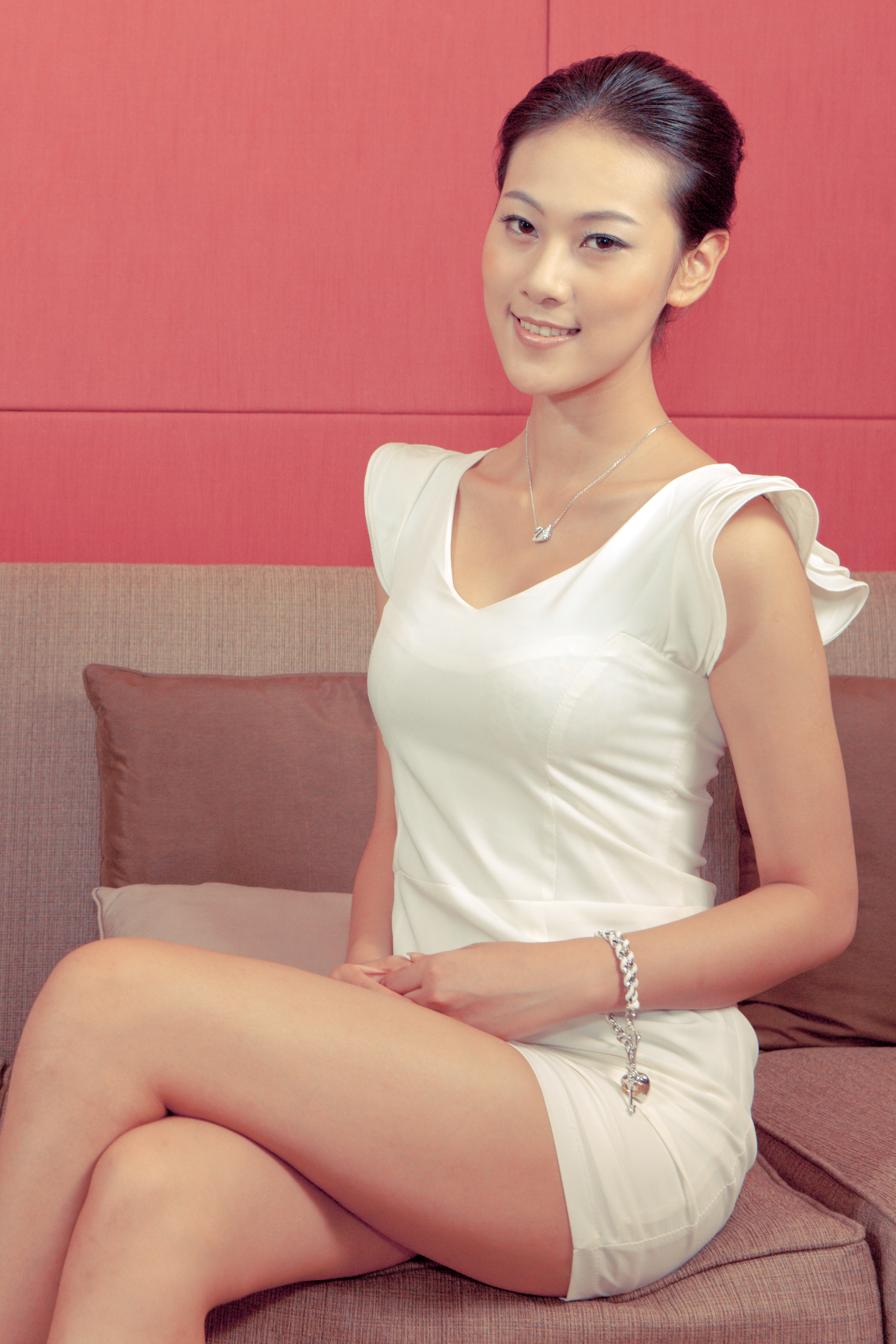
Woman from the People's Republic of China

After the founding of the PRC in 1949, newly established local governments continued to prioritize women's political mobilization. Mao's statement that "women hold up half the sky" became a major slogan symbolizing the PRC's support for women's social and political equality with men. The cultural stigma against young women working outside the home disintegrated. Chinese grandmothers increased their roles as caregivers for their grandchildren, facilitating younger women's opportunities for paid work. In a weakening of traditional Chinese patrilineality, grandmothers on the mother's side gained equal status to grandmothers on the father's side allowing them to fill gaps in childcare.

Soon after its founding, the PRC passed the New Marriage Law of 1950. It prohibited concubinage and marriages when one party was sexually powerless, suffered from a venereal disease, leprosy, or a mental disorder. The law abolished arranged marriages, paying money or goods for a wife, and outlawed polygamy and child marriage. Following the passage of the 1950 Marriage Law, mass campaigns promoted the principle of freely-chosen monogamous marriages and official registration of marriage.

John Engel, a professor of Family Resources at the University of Hawaii, writes that the PRC established the Marriage Law of 1950 to redistribute wealth and achieve a classless society. The law "was intended to cause ... fundamental changes ... aimed at family revolution by destroying all former patterns ... and building up new relationships on the basis of the new law and new ethics." Xiaorong Li, a researcher at the Institute for Philosophy and Public Policy at the University of Maryland, asserts that the Marriage Law of 1950 not only banned the most extreme forms of female subordination and oppression, but gave women the right to make their own marital decisions. Several decades after the implementation of the 1950 Marriage Law, China still faced serious issues, particularly in population control.

In the 1950s, high-level female CCP cadre had a significant role in advocating for greater access to abortion and sterilization surgeries—in their view, women could not "hold up half the sky" nor advance their revolutionary work if they had too many children.

In the 1950s, the political campaign for "Five-Good Families" urged families to practice the principles of (1) "harmony between husbands and wives"; (2) "equality between men and women"; (3) "frugality in housekeeping"; (4) "solidarity among neighbors"; and (5) "honoring elders and caring for the young."

From the 1950s onwards, China sought to pursue gender equality by including women in the formal labor force. In urban areas, this process was facilitated by the development of a network of public nurseries, daycare centers, and kindergartens. In rural areas, working mothers obtained support from mothers-in-law and other extended family members, usually on the father's side.

The Great Leap Forward's focus on total workforce mobilization resulted in opportunities for women's labor advancement. The necessity of mobilizing women's labor prompted the relaxing on birth control restrictions. Increasing collectivization of labor brought more opportunities for women to "leave the home", thereby increasing their economic and personal independence. The number of women in state institutions and state-owned enterprises more than tripled during the period 1957 to 1960. Mao Zedong contended that if people's communes were run well, "there is a thorough road for women's liberation. The People's communes are carrying out a wage system and a supply system under which wages are paid to each individual, not to the family head. This makes women and young people happy, and it's a way of smashing the patriarchal system, and the ideology of bourgeois right."

As women became increasingly needed to work in agriculture and industry, and encouraged by policy to do so, the phenomenon of Iron Women arose. Women did traditionally male work in both fields and factories, including major movements of women into management positions. Women competed for high productivity, and those who distinguished themselves came to be called Iron Women. Women workers on the mobile film projection teams which brought cinema to rural China were promoted by media as model workers and symbols of advancing gender equality. Slogans such as "There is no difference between men and women in this new age," and "We can do anything, and anything we do, we can do it well," became popular. As academic Jacob Eyferth observes, "Many young women enthusiastically embraced the challenge of demonstrating they could work as hard as men."

Women's increasing roles in agricultural labor also had the indirect effect of supporting heavy industry campaign through increasing the availability of men for labor in projects such as the Third Front construction.

During the Cultural Revolution, one way China promoted its policy of state feminism was through revolutionary opera. Most of the eight model dramas in this period featured women as their main characters. The narratives of these women protagonists begin with them oppressed by misogyny, class position, and imperialism before liberating themselves through the discovery of their own internal strength and the CCP.

A second marriage law was passed in 1980 and enacted in 1981. This New Marriage Law banned arranged and forced marriages and shifted the focus away from the dominance of men and onto the interests of children and women. Article 2 of the 1980 Marriage Law directly states: "the lawful rights and interests of women, children and the aged are protected. Family planning is practiced." Adults, both men and women, also gained the right to lawful divorce.

To fight the tenacity of tradition, Article 3 of the 1980 Marriage Law continued to ban concubinage, polygamy, and bigamy. The article forbade mercenary marriages in which a bride price or dowry is paid. According to Li, the traditional business of selling women in exchange for marriage returned after the law gave women the right to select their husbands. In 1990, 18,692 cases were investigated by Chinese authorities.

Although the law generally prohibited the exaction of money or gifts in connection with marriage arrangements, bride price payments are still common in rural areas, though dowries have become smaller and less common. As of 2024, a Xi'an Jiotong University research group reported that a bride price (caili) in northern Shaanxi was an average of 131,000 yuan (US$18,416) while dowries were 61,700 yuan (US$8,630). In urban areas the dowry custom has nearly disappeared. The bride price custom has often transformed into providing gifts for the bride or her family. Article 4 of the 1980 marriage law banned the usage of compulsion or the interference of third parties, stating: "marriage must be based upon the complete willingness of the two parties." As Engel argues, the law also encouraged gender equality by making daughters just as valuable as sons, particularly in the potential for old-age insurance. Article 8 states: "after a marriage has been registered, the woman may become a member of the man's family, or the man may become a member of the woman's family, according to the agreed wishes of the two parties."

In 2001, the Marriage Law was further revised to protect women from the harmful social trends following China's market reforms, such as polygamy by wealthy men and underpaid female labor. The law was deliberated via an open revision process which included input from feminist academics and women lawyers. Other civil and criminal laws were also amended to better protect women's rights and interests, including the inheritance law. In rural areas, women are often not conferred equal property rights depending on marriage relations.

In 2019, a government directive was released banning employers in China from posting "men preferred" or "men only" job advertising, and banning companies from asking women seeking jobs about their childbearing and marriage plans or requiring applicants to take pregnancy tests.

== Women and family ==
=== Marriage and family planning ===
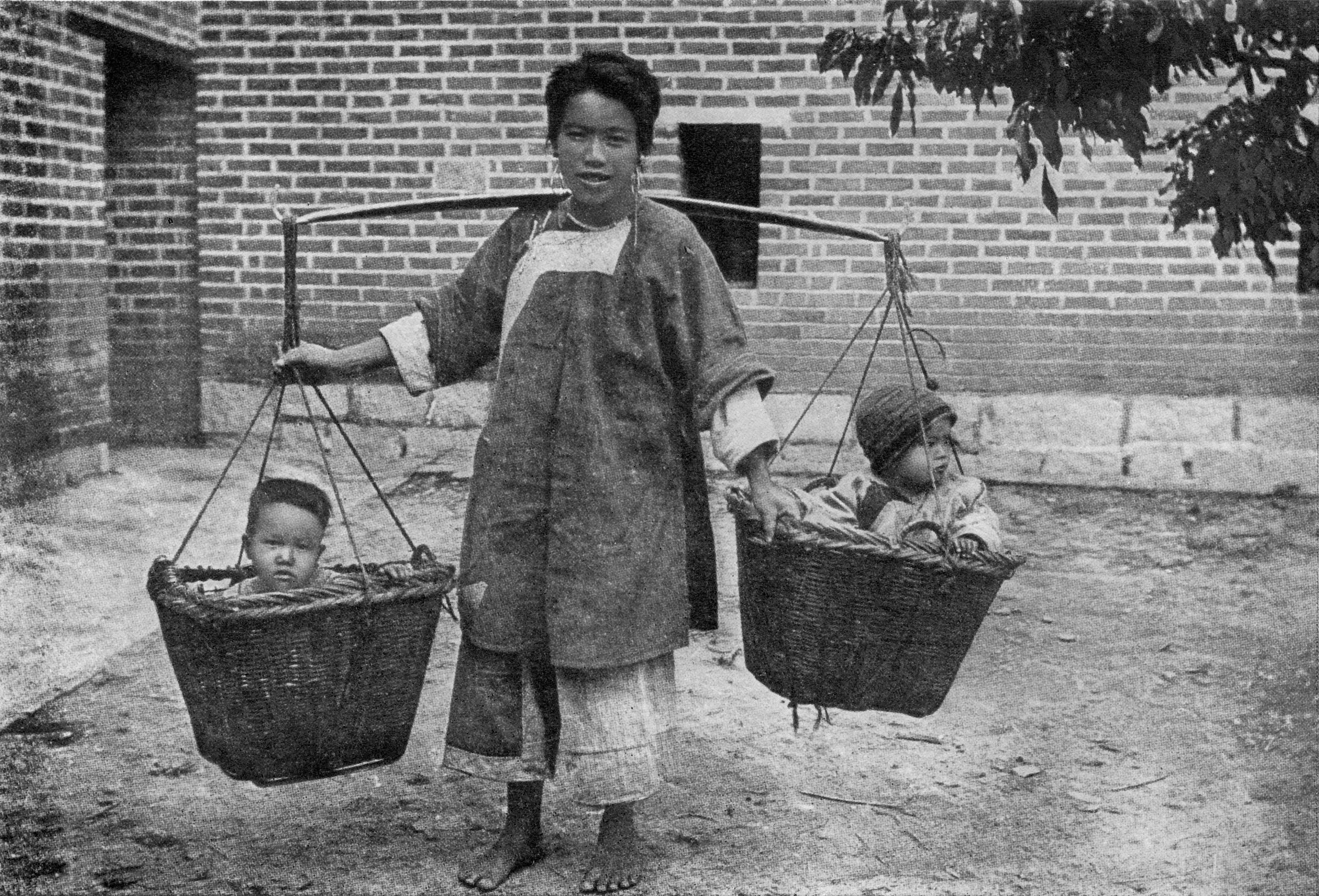
Mother carrying two children, 1917

Traditional marriage in pre-revolutionary China was a contract between families rather than between individuals. The parents of the soon-to-be groom and bride arranged the marriage with an emphasis on alliance between the two families. Spouse selection was based on family needs and the socioeconomic status of the potential mate, rather than love or attraction. Although the woman's role varied slightly with the husband's social status, typically her main duty was to provide a son to continue the family name.

Arranged marriages were accomplished by a matchmaker, who acted as a link between the two families. The arrangement of a marriage involved the negotiation of a bride price, gifts to be bestowed to the bride's family, and occasionally a dowry of clothing, furniture, or jewelry from the bride's family for use in her new home. Exchange of monetary compensation for a woman's hand in marriage was also used in purchase marriages.

The Japanese invasion of China during the Second Sino-Japanese War strained traditional family structures. It resulted in mass separations of the old from the young, particularly as the young fled into areas not under Japanese occupation or became soldiers. As a result of the war, young women were also able to find work outside the home, which provided liberty from the traditional households.

The New Marriage Law of 1950 set minimum ages to marry (age 20 for men and age 18 for women). It encouraged women to use their own family names. The law provided women the right to initiate divorce proceedings stated that women could own land in their own right, regardless of whether they were single, married, widowed, or divorced.

During the Mao era, the increased mixing of men and women at work and school increased opportunities for men and women to socialize and meet, increasing the frequency of free-choice marriage.

In 2013, Xi Jinping stated that it was necessary for women to be "good wives and mothers" to ensure the "healthy growth of the next generation". During the 2020 National People's Congress, a civil code was adopted which contained a number of significant changes for China's laws on marriage and family. A 30-day "cooling off period" was added to divorce proceedings. Before then, some divorces were finalized within hours of application, leading to concerns about impulsive divorces.

In addition the new civil code continues to define marriage as only between a man and a woman. The state news agency Xinhua described the new civil code as guarantying "a harmonious family and society". Writing for The Diplomat, Chauncey Jung writes that these revisions to the civil code complete a transition from the women hold up half of the sky era in which, at least rhetorically, China was one of the most progressive nations in the world in terms of women's rights to more regressive era of "strong family values for a harmonious society". In 2022, an amendment to the Women's Rights and Interests Protection Law directed women to protect "family values".

In 2024, local governments were reported to call women to inquire about their pregnancy status, menstruation cycles, and intentions to have children.

=== Policies on divorce ===
The Marriage Law of 1950 empowered women to initiate divorce proceedings. According to Elaine Jeffreys, an Australian Research Council Future Fellow and associate professor in China studies, divorce requests were only granted if they were justified by politically proper reasons. These requests were mediated by CCP-affiliated organizations, rather than accredited legal systems. Chinese women were praised in society if they refused remarriage and remained alive to take care of their spouse's family. Professors Ralph Haughwout Folsom and John H. Minan write that the Marriage Law of 1950 allowed for much flexibility in the refusal of divorce when only one party sought it. During the market-based economic reforms, China re-instituted a formal legal system and implemented provisions for divorce on a more individualized basis.

Jeffreys asserts that the Marriage Law of 1980 provided for divorce on the basis that emotions or mutual affections were broken. As a result of the more liberal grounds for divorce, the divorce rates soared. As women began divorcing their husbands tensions increased and men resisted, especially in rural areas. Although divorce was now legally recognized, thousands of women lost their lives for attempting to divorce their husbands and some committed suicide when the right to divorce was withheld. Divorce, once seen as a rare act during the Mao era (1949–1976), has become more common with rates continuing to increase. Along with this increase in divorce, it became evident that divorced women were often given an unfair share or housing and property.

The amended Marriage Law of 2001, which according to Jeffreys was designed to protect women's rights, provided a solution to this problem by reverting to a "moralistic fault-based system with a renewed focus on collectivist mechanisms to protect marriage and family". Although all property acquired during a marriage was seen as jointly held, it was not until the implementation of Article 46 of the 2001 Marriage Law that the concealment of joint property was punishable. This was enacted to ensure a fair division during a divorce. The article also granted the right for a party to request compensation from a spouse who committed illegal cohabitation, bigamy, and family violence or desertion.

The 2003 divorce law removed the requirement that couples undergo mediation prior to divorce.

As of 2019, women initiated more than 70% of divorces in China.

During Xi Jinping's general secretaryship, the resurgent propaganda of traditional family values in Chinese discourse with the aim to increase birth rates created more obstacles for divorce. In 2020, the "民法典" [minfadian; Civil Code] adopted at the Third Session of the Thirteenth National People's Congress on May 28 introduced a 30-day "cool-off period" for divorce. Article 2077 in Book Five Chapter IV states "Where either party is unwilling to divorce, he may withdraw the divorce registration application within thirty days after such an application is received by the marriage registration authority. Within thirty days after expiration of the period provided in the preceding paragraph, both parties shall personally visit the marriage registration authority to apply for issuance of a divorce certificate, and failing to do so will cause the divorce registration application to be deemed as withdrawn." The news regarding the implementation of "cool-off period" immediately triggered widespread outrage on social media platforms, for many think it interferes with their marital freedom and even jeopardizes the condition for victims of domestic violence. Regarding the worries of the general public, the Legislative Affairs Commission with the NPC Standing Committee claims that extreme situations including domestic violence and drug abuse do not need a "cool-off period" which only concerns with consensual divorce and those cases would be solved by lawsuit. However, several cases of domestic violence or murder after the "cool-off period" came in effect pose doubts regarding the reality of such practice.

=== Second wives ===
In traditional China, polygamy was legal and having a concubine was considered a luxury for aristocratic families. Dynastic ambitions were the formal justification for polygamy in that era, as important families sought to increase the number of sons and cement their social and economic ambitions through arranged marriage. Male sexual gratification was also an underlying motivation for polygamy, and concubines were typically younger than wives and chosen for looks rather than social status.

Polygamy continued into the Republic of China era under the Nationalist government. During the nationalist period, other forms of polygamy emerged. One form included two wives but not polygamous cohabitation - for example, if a young man had an arranged marriage in his village and then married a second time while at university. Another form included dual families where a man married and had a family in China and married again while living and traveling abroad. In the 1930s and 1940s, a man could only have one official wife, but polygamy remained in wealthier households where in addition to an official wife, a wealthy man might have a concubine.

In 1950, polygamy was outlawed, but the phenomenon of de facto polygamy, or so-called "second wives" (二奶 èrnǎi in Chinese), has reemerged in recent years. When polygamy was legal, women were more tolerant of their husband's extramarital affairs. Today, women who discover that their husband has a "second wife" are less tolerant, and since the New Marriage Law of 1950 can ask for a divorce.

The sudden industrialization in China brought two types of people together: young female workers and rich businessmen from cities like Hong Kong. In British-ruled Hong Kong, polygamy was legal until 1971 pursuant to the British colonial practice of not interfering in local customs that Britain viewed as relatively harmless to the public order. A number of rich businessmen are attracted to these economically dependent women and started relationships known as "keeping a second wife" (bao yinai) in Cantonese. Some migrant women who struggle to find husbands become second wives and lovers. There are many villages in the southern part of China where predominantly these "second wives" live. The men come and spend a large amount of time in these villages every year while their first wife and family stay in the city. The relationships can range from just being casual paid sexual transactions to long-term relationships. If a relationship does develop more, some of the Chinese women quit their job and become 'live-in lovers' whose main job is to please the working man.

The first wives in these situations have a hard time and deal with it in different ways. Women that are far away from their husbands do not have many options. Even if the wives do move to mainland China with their husbands, the businessman still finds ways to carry on affairs. Some wives follow the motto "one eye open, with the other eye closed" meaning they understand their husbands are bound to cheat but want to make sure they practice safe sex and do not bring home other children. Many first wives downplay the father's role to try to address the children's questions about a father that is often absent. Other women fear for their financial situations and protect their rights by putting the house and other major assets in their own names.

This situation has created many social and legal issues. Unlike previous generations of arranged marriages, the modern polygamy is more often voluntary. Women in China face serious pressures to be married, by family and friends. There is a derogatory term for women who are not married by the time they are in their late twenties, sheng nu.

== Education ==
Female primary and secondary school enrollment suffered more than male enrollment during the Great Chinese Famine (1958–1961), and in 1961 there was a further sudden decrease.

As of 2023, Chinese girls receive more schooling on average than boys. A number of studies attribute the improvement in girls' schooling to the effects of the one-child policy. Gender disparity persisted into the 1990s for tertiary institutions. By 2009, however, half of all college students were women. China's rate of increase in women's higher education levels has been substantially greater than countries with similar, and some countries with higher, per capita income levels. Studies for the years 2000-2009 found that Chinese women had higher financial returns on education than men did, with an 11-12% return per year of schooling compared with 6-7% for men. In 2023, 81% of Chinese women aged 19–23 enrolled in universities, colleges, vocational schools, or technical schools, compared to 69.5% of Chinese men.

== Health care ==
In traditional Chinese culture, which was a patriarchal society based on Confucian ideology, the healthcare system was tailored for men, and women were not prioritized. Traditional culture emphasized the role of grandmothers in the management of childbirth. Chinese health care has since undergone much reform and has tried to provide men and women with equal health care.

The People's Republic of China has enacted various laws to protect the health care rights of women, including the 1995 Maternal and Child Care law which has made substantive improvements.

In the PRC's early years, traditional midwives came to be viewed as dirty and unscientific. By 1959, over 750,000 midwives were retrained with some modern medical practice, but only 5,300 were fully modern trained midwives. With China's program of barefoot doctors, perinatal practitioners were often older women. Their work was effective, with much of the 1950s and 1960s population boom resulting from the decline in infant mortality.

During the Cultural Revolution (1966–1976), the People's Republic of China began to focus on the provision of health care for women. This change was apparent when the women in the workforce were granted health care. Health care policy required all women workers to receive urinalysis and vaginal examinations yearly.

For women in China today, the most common type of cancer is cervical cancer. The World Health Organization (WHO) suggests using routine screening to detect cervical cancer. However, information on cervical cancer screening is not widely available for women in China.

Abortion in China is legal and generally accessible. Abortions are widely accepted and available to all women through China's family planning programme, public hospitals, private hospitals, and clinics nationwide. In August 2022, the National Health Commission announced that it would direct measures toward "preventing unintended pregnancy and reducing abortions that are not medically necessary" in an effort to boost population growth. The announced support measures include improvements with regard to insurance and taxation, improvements for education and housing, and encouraging local governments to boost infant care services and family friendly workplaces.

== Ethnic and religious minorities ==
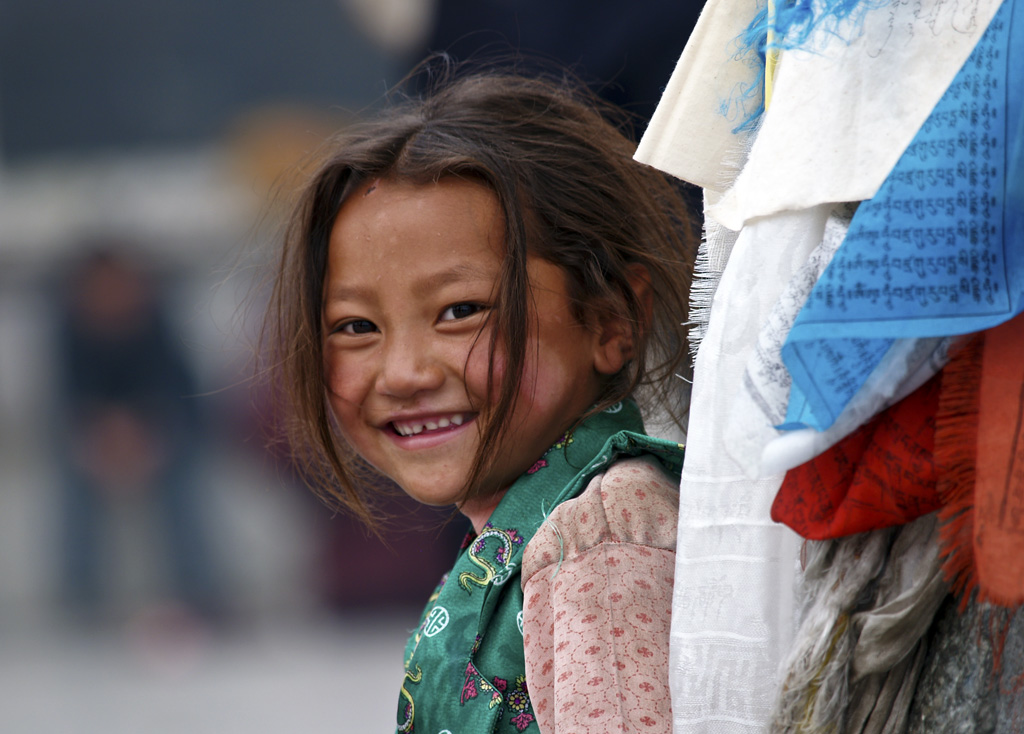
Girl from Tibet

After the founding of People's Republic of China in 1949, the communist government authorities called traditional Muslim customs on women "backwards or feudal".

Hui Muslim women have internalized the concept of gender equality and they exercise rights like initiating divorce.

A unique feature of Islam in China is the presence of female-only mosques. Women in China can act as prayer leaders and also become imams. Female-only mosques grant women more power over religious affairs. This is rare by global standards. By comparison, the first women's mosque in the United States did not open until January 2015.

Among the Hui people, Quranic schools for girls evolved into woman-only mosques and women acted as imams as early as 1820. These imams are known as nü ahong (女阿訇), i.e. "female akhoond", and they guide female Muslims in worship and prayer.

Due to Beijing having tight control over religious practices — including reports of government officials closing and destroying mosques — Chinese Muslims are more isolated from more fundamentalist strains of Islam which emerged after the 1979 Iranian Revolution. According to Dr Khaled Abou El Fadl from the University of California in Los Angeles, this explains the situation whereby female imams and women's mosques continue to exist in China.

Among Uyghurs, it was believed that God designed women to endure hardship and work. The word for "helpless one", ʿājiza, was used for women who were not married, while women who were married were called mazlūm in Xinjiang; however, divorce and remarriage was facile for the women. The modern Uyghur dialect in Turfan uses the Arabic word for oppressed, maẓlum, to refer to "married old woman" and pronounce it as mäzim. Women were normally referred to as "oppressed person" (mazlum-kishi). 13 or 12 years old was the age of marriage for women in Khotan, Yarkand, and Kashgar.

During the last years of imperial China, Swedish Christian missionaries observed the oppressive conditions for Uyghur Muslim women in Xinjiang during their stay between 1892 and 1938. Uyghur Muslim women were oppressed and often held domestic service positions, while Han Chinese women were free and given a choice of profession. When Uyghur Muslim women married Han Chinese men, the women were hated by their families and people. The Uyghur Muslims viewed single unmarried women as prostitutes and held them in extreme disregard. Child marriages for girls were very common and the Uyghurs called girls "overripe" if they were not married by 15 or 16 years old. Four wives were allowed along with any number of temporary marriages contracted by Mullahs to "pleasure wives" for a set time period. Divorce and marriage was rampant, each being conducted by Mullahs simultaneously, and some men married hundreds of women and could divorce their wives for no given reason. Wives were forced to stay in the household, to be obedient to their husbands, and were judged according to how many children they could bear.

The birth of a girl was seen as a terrible calamity by the local Uyghur Muslims and boys were worth more to them. The constant stream of marriage and divorces led to children being mistreated by stepparents.

A Swedish missionary said "These girls were surely the first girls in Eastern Turkestan who had had a real youth before getting married. The Muslim woman has no youth. Directly from childhood's carefree playing of games, she enters life's bitter everyday toil… She is but a child and a wife." The Muslims also attacked the Swedish Christian mission and Hindus resident in the city. Lobbying by Swedish Christian missionaries led to child marriage for under 15-year-old girls to be banned by the Chinese Governor in Urumqi, although the Uyghur Muslims ignored the law.

== Population control ==
=== One-child policy ===
In 1956, the Chinese government publicly announced its goal to control the exponentially increasing population size. The government planned to use education and publicity as their main modes of increasing awareness. Zhou Enlai launched the first program for smaller families under the guidance of Madame Li Teh-chuan, the Minister of Health at the time. During this time, family planning and contraceptive usage were highly publicized and encouraged.

The One-child policy, initiated in 1978 and first applied in 1979, mandated that each married couple may bear only one child except in the case of special circumstances. These conditions included, "the birth of a first child who has developed a non-hereditary disability that will make it difficult to perform productive labour later in life, the fact that both husband and wife are themselves single children, a misdiagnosis of barrenness in the wife combined with a passage of more than five years after the adoption of a child, and a remarrying husband and wife who have between them only one child." The law was replaced by a two-child policy in 2015, and then a three-child policy in 2021. On July 26, 2021, all restrictions were lifted, allowing Chinese couples to have any number of children.

=== Sex-selective abortion ===
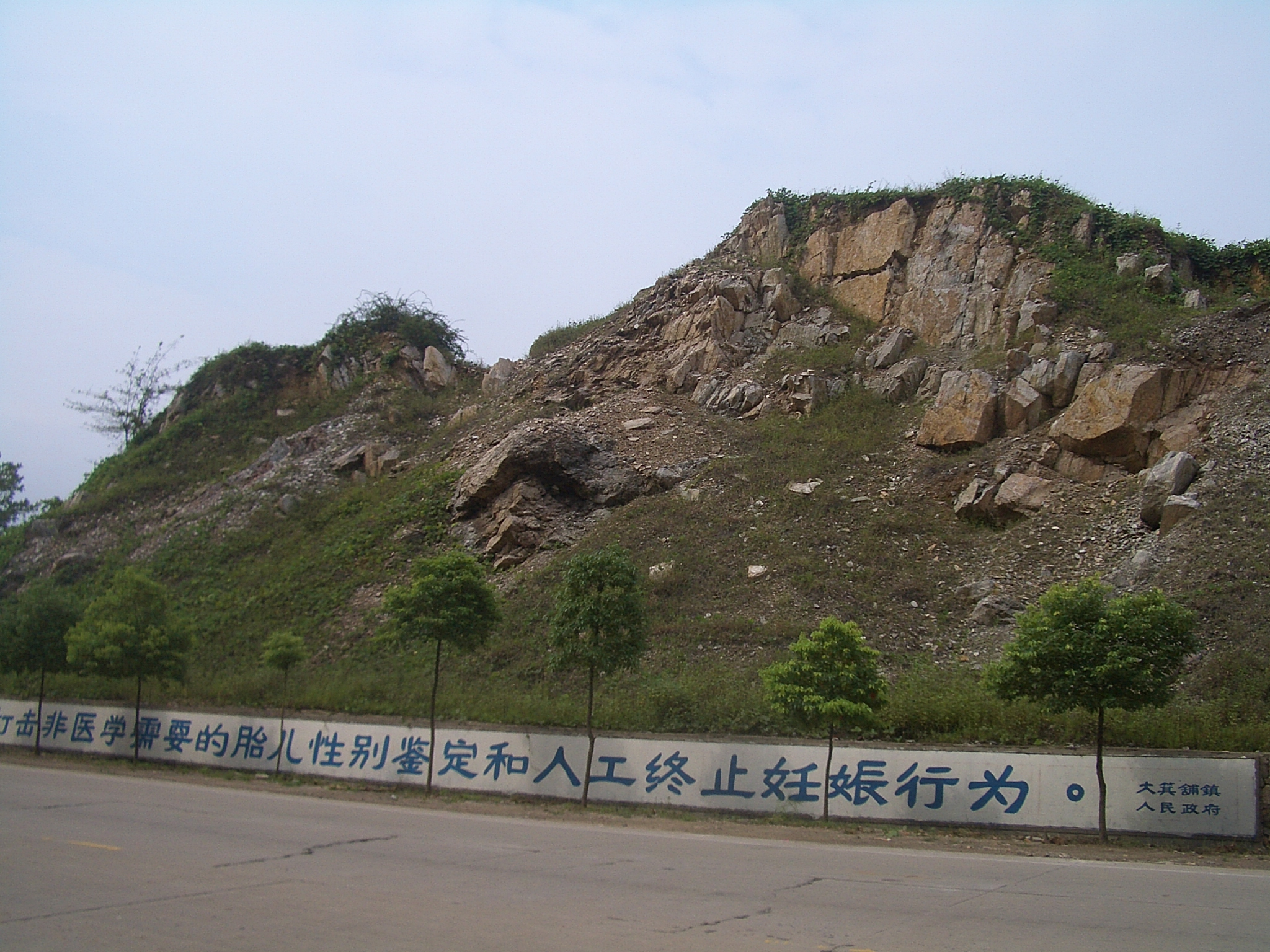
A roadside slogan calls motorists to crack down on medically unnecessary antenatal sex identification and sex-selective pregnancy termination practices. (Daye, Hubei, 2008)

In China, males are traditionally thought to be of greater value to a family because they take on greater responsibilities, have the capacity to earn higher wages, continue the family line, receive an inheritance, and are able to care for their elderly parents. The preference for sons coupled with the one-child-policy have led to a high rate of sex-selective abortion in China. Therefore, mainland China has a highly masculine sex ratio. Amartya Sen, the Nobel Prize-winning economist, asserted in 1990 that over 100 million women were missing globally, with 50 million women missing from China alone. Sen attributed the deficit in the number of women to sex-selective abortion, female infanticide, and inadequate nutrition for girls, all of which have were exacerbated by the One-child policy.

In 1986, the National Commission for Family Planning and the Ministry of Health prohibited prenatal sex determination except when diagnosing hereditary diseases.Individuals or clinics that violate the prohibition are subject to fines. This prohibition was repeatedly affirmed in the 1980s, 1990s, and early 2000s.Since the 1990s, government efforts to promote daughter/son equality in family planning and to eliminate the traditional son preference in China have increased, further accelerating after the United Nations-sponsored Caring for Girls national campaign in 2003. Sex-selective abortions in China are illegal.

The sex ratio between male and female births in mainland China reached 117:100 in the year 2000, substantially more masculine than the natural baseline, which ranges between 103:100 and 107:100. It had risen from 108:100 in 1981—at the boundary of the natural baseline—to 111:100 in 1990.

When family planning policies limited the number of children a family could have, immense social pressures are placed upon women. Women are mostly blamed when giving birth to a girl. Women were subjected to forced abortions if they appear to be having a girl. This situation led to higher female infanticide rates and female deaths in China.

Other Asian regions also have higher than average ratios, including Taiwan (110:100), which does not have a family planning policy. Many studies have explored the reason for the gender-based birthrate disparity in China as well as other countries. A study in 1990 attributed the high preponderance of reported male births in mainland China to four main causes: diseases which affect females more severely than males; the result of widespread under-reporting of female births; the illegal practice of sex-selective abortion made possible by the widespread availability of ultrasound; and finally, acts of child abandonment and infanticide.

=== Iron Fist Campaign ===
According to reports by Amnesty International, family planning officials in Puning City, Guangdong Province, launched the Iron Fist Campaign in April 2010. This campaign targeted individuals for sterilization in an attempt to control population growth. The targeted individuals were asked to go to governmental clinics where they would be sterilized. If they refused the procedure, then they put their families at risk for detainment.

The Iron Fist Campaign lasted for 20 days and targeted 9,559 individuals. Approximately 50 percent consented and 1,377 relatives of targeted couples were detained. Family planning officials defended the Iron Fist Campaign, asserting that the large population of migrant workers in Puning misunderstood the One-child policy and therefore had not complied with family planning regulations. In an attempt to standardize family planning policies across all of China, the Population and Family Planning Law of 2002 was implemented, which protects individual rights and bans the usage of coercion or detainment.

=== Pro-natalist policies ===
In the 2020s, cash incentives have been offered to increase birth rates. As of 2024, China is the second most expensive country in which to raise a child. Local government family-planning committees, previously used to enforce the one-child policy, are deployed for pro-natalist policies such as calling women to check on their menstrual cycle. Some cities have resorted to AI-generated robocalls for women.

== Property ownership ==
In current-day China, women enjoy legal equal rights to property, but in practice, these rights can be rescinded. Chinese women have historically held little rights to private property, both by societal customs and by law. In imperial China (before 1911 CE), family households held property collectively, rather than as individual members of the household. This property customarily belonged to the family ancestral clan, with legal control belonging to the family head, or the eldest male.

Ancestry in imperial China was patrilineal, or passed through the male, and women could not share in the family property. Upon the death of the head of the household, the property was passed to the eldest son. In the absence of an eligible son, a family would often adopt a son to continue the family line and property. However, as Kathryn Bernhardt, a scholar of Chinese history points out, nearly one in three women during the Song dynasty (960–1279 CE) would either have no brothers or no sons, leaving them with some agency over family property. In these cases, unmarried daughters would receive their fathers' property in the absence of direct male descendants, or an unmarried widow would choose the family heir. A law enacted during the Ming dynasty (1368–1644 CE) required that in the absence of a direct male descendant, a man's property was to go to his nephews. With this change in law, women's access to private property was even more restricted. At that point, only if none of a man's sons and none of his brothers' sons were alive to inherit property would a daughter receive the inheritance.

In most cases, the most control over family property that a widow would receive was maintenance, or the agency to control the property while an heir came of age. In some cases after some reforms in the Qing dynasty (1644–1912), some women could retain maintenance over undivided property even after their sons came of age. Law during the Republican era interpreted this to mean that widows held complete power over sons in control of the family property.

The Kuomintang, which assumed power over China in 1911, publicly advocated for gender equality, though not very many changes in property rights went into effect until the enactment of the Republican Civil Code in 1930, which changed the definitions of property and family inheritance. The code specified that family property legally belonged to the father, with no connection to the ancestral clan. Inheritance of this property was based on direct lineage, regardless of gender, so that sons and daughters would receive an equal share of family property upon the death of their parents. Furthermore, a man's will or appointment of a different heir could not fully bypass the legally mandated inheritance structures, preventing families from holding onto gender-discriminatory customs. Despite the law's equitable wording on the property, some scholars, such as Deborah Davis and Kathryn Bernhardt, point out that the legal definitions regarding property may not have entirely changed the practices of the general public.

The People's Republic of China (PRC), which assumed control in 1949, also promised gender equality. The PRC's approach was different from the Kuomintang. The New Marriage Law of 1950 provided established the right of women to own property in their own name, regardless of whether they were single, married, widowed, or divorced. With regards to land, all land was owned by the state and allocated for people to use, so technically no individual, male or female, owned land. In 1978, the Chinese government set up a household farming system that split agricultural land into small plots for villages to allocate to citizens.

The land was distributed to households with legal responsibility in the family head or the eldest male. A woman's access to land was then contingent on her being part of a household. Land leases were technically supposed to transfer with marriage to a woman's marital family, meaning women could potentially lose land upon marriage. In some rural areas, women can lose property rights if they marry outside of the village.

For property other than land, new Chinese laws allow for the distinction between personal and communal property. Married couples can simultaneously own some things individually while sharing others with their spouse and family. With regard to divorce, Chinese law generally demands a 50/50 split of property. The Marriage Law of 1980 defined different types of divorce that would split the conjugal property differently, such as instances of adultery or domestic violence.

Since most divorce disputes are settled at a local level, the law allows courts to review specific situations and make decisions in the best interest of the children. Typically, such a decision would simultaneously favor the mother, especially in disputes over a house where the children would live. In some divorce disputes "ownership" and "use" over property would be distinguished, giving a mother and child "use" of the family house without awarding the mother full ownership of the house.

== Employment ==
If female labor force participation is used as the indicator to measure gender equality, China would be one of the most egalitarian countries in the world: female labor force participation in China increased dramatically after the founding of the People's Republic and almost reached a universal level. Women's participation in the work force had been a policy goal since 1949, and increased greatly during the Great Leap Forward, as the need for total workforce mobilization in that period caused women to take on traditionally male roles.

According to a study by Bauer et al., of women who married between 1950 and 1965, 70 percent had jobs, and women who married between 1966 and 1976, 92 percent had jobs. In 1982, Chinese working women represented 43 percent of the total population, a larger proportion than either working American women (35.3 percent) or working Japanese women (36 percent). As a result of the increased participation in the labor force, women's contribution to family income increased from 20 percent in the 1950s to 40 percent in the 1990s.

China has one of the world's most gender-balanced technical and professional work force and wage equality between women and men.

As of 2023, Chinese women earn $11,000 less than men based on 2021 purchasing power parity, representing a 41 percent gap. As of 2025, the World Economic Forum ranks China 31st out of 148 countries in wage inequality, ranking ahead of the United States at 40th, the United Kingdom at 54th, Japan at 93rd and South Korea at 94th.

=== Rural work ===
In traditional China, the land was passed down from father to son and in the case of no son, the land was then given to a close male relative. Although in the past women in China were not granted ownership of land, today in rural areas of the People's Republic of China, women possess pivotal roles in farming, which allows them control over the area's central sources of production.

Population greatly affects the mode of farming that is utilized, which determines the duties women have. According to tishwayan Thomas Rawski, a professor of Economics and History at the University of Pittsburgh, the Shifting cultivation method is utilized in less populated areas and results in women performing more of the agricultural duties, whereas in more populated areas complicated plough cultivation is used.

Men typically performs plough cultivation, but during periods of high demand women pitch in with agricultural duties of planting, harvesting and transporting. Women also have key roles in tea cultivation and double-cropping rice. Agricultural income is supplemented by women's work in animal rearing, spinning, basket construction, weaving, and the production of other various crafts.

=== Urban and migrant work ===
In China, only the person who works (not their spouse) receives social security benefits. This is a factor contributing to women's high participation in the urban workplace.

The People's Republic of China's dependence on low-wage manufacturing to produce goods for the international market is due to changes in China's economic policies. These economic policies have also encouraged the export industries. Urban industrial areas are staffed with young migrant women workers who leave their rural homes. Since males are more likely than females to attend college, rural females often migrate to urban employment in hopes of supplementing their families' incomes.

In 1984 the reform of the Regulations of Permanent Residence Registration marked an increase in the migration of rural Chinese workers. As the restrictions on residence became more lenient, less penalizing, and permitted people to travel to find employment, more women engaged in migrant labor. In the cities, women could find low-paying work as factory workers. These increased employment opportunities drew women out of rural areas in hopes of escaping poverty. Although this reformed system enabled the migration of rural residents, it prohibited them from accepting any benefits in the cities or changing their permanent residence, which led to a majority of migrant workers not receiving any forms of medical care, education, or housing.

Nationally, male migrant workers outnumber female migrants 2:1, i.e. women comprise about 30% of the so-called 'floating population'. However, in some areas, Guangdong Province, for example, the ratio favors women. In the industrial district of Nanshan in Shenzhen, 80 percent of the migrant workers were women. A preference for younger women over older women has led to a predominantly young population of migrant workers.

Married women have more restrictions on mobility due to duties to the family, whereas younger women are more likely to not be married. Also, younger rural women are less likely to become pregnant, possess nimble fingers, are more able to work longer hours, and are less knowledgeable about their statutory rights. For the women who are able to gain employment, they then face the possibility of being forced to sign a contract prohibiting them from getting pregnant or married during their period of employment. Chinese law mandates the coverage of maternity leave and costs of childbirth. These maternity laws have led to employers' reluctance to hire women.

=== E-commerce ===
Official data by Alibaba and a study by academic Lizhi Liu. conclude that more than half of Taobao online store owners are women. Liu attributes the substantial presence of female business owners in Chinese e-commerce to their tendency to have extensive knowledge on product categories that are frequently sold online, the anonymity of online platforms reduction in gender bias, and the existence of flexible hours and remote work.

=== Stereotypically "feminine" jobs and professions ===
Along with economic reforms in China, gender differences in terms of physical appearance and bodily gestures have been made more visible through the media and commerce. This has created jobs that demand stereotypically feminine attributes, particularly in the service industry. Sales representatives in cosmetics and clothing stores are usually young, attractive women who continually cultivate their feminine appearance, corresponding to images of women in advertisements.

Chinese women nowadays also dominate other domains of professional training such as psychotherapy. Courses and workshops in psychotherapy attract women of different ages who feel the burden of sensitively mastering social relations in and outside their households and at the same time as a channel to realize themselves as individuals not reduced to their familial roles as mothers or wives.

=== Women executives ===
Women are substantially less represented in senior management than men. According to the China Stock Market and Accounting Research Database, the proportion of women executives of publicly traded Chinese companies has increased in age cohorts from executives born in the 1950s to executives born in the 1990s. As of 2017, only 12% of executives born in the 1950s were women, compared with 23% of those born in the 1970s, 35% of those born in the 1980s, and 42% of those born in the 1990s.

=== Female Billionaires ===
In 2018 of all self-made female billionaires in the world, 61% were from China, including nine out of the top 10, as well as the world's richest self-made female billionaire Zhong Huijuan.

== Women in politics ==
The Chinese Women's University was inaugurated on 20 July 1939 in Yan'an to develop female cadres; Mao Zedong's inauguration speech emphasized the role of women in the Second Sino-Japanese War.

Mao established a quota for the inclusion of women within CCP leadership, although few women have reached the highest positions within the party.

Early gender politics in the PRC focused on women stepping out of the household and into public life and work, including participation in politics.

Rural women had a significant impact on China's land reform movement, with the CCP making specific efforts to mobilize them for agrarian revolution. CCP activists observed that because peasant women were less tied to old power structures, they more readily opposed those identified as class enemies. Beginning in 1943, the CCP publicized the efforts of female model workers in agriculture. In 1947, Deng Yingchao emphasized at a land reform policy meeting that "women function as great mobilizers when they speak bitterness." The All-China Women's Federation issued a call to CCP activists to encourage peasant women to understand their "special bitterness" from a class perspective. Women activists helped peasant women prepare to speak in public, including by roleplaying as landlords to help such women practice.

During the Cultural Revolution, two women who were model workers -- Wu Guixian and Li Suwen—rose to become national level political leaders in only seven years.

Women's political disadvantage is most evident in their severe under representation in the more powerful political positions. At the top level of decision making, no woman has ever been among the nine members of the Politburo Standing Committee. The broader Politburo also has no women members since 2022. Just 3 of 27 government ministers are women, and importantly, since 1997, China has fallen to 53rd place from 16th in the world in terms of female representation at its parliament, the National People's Congress, according to the Inter-Parliamentary Union. CCP leaders such as Zhao Ziyang have vigorously opposed the participation of women in the political process. Within the CCP, women face a glass ceiling.

Since the early 2000s, China's civil service has institutionalized recruitment quotas for women (along with other quotas for non-CCP members and ethnic groups), to increase representation in the civil service.

Chinese women in politics generally have higher levels of educational attainment than men, with 75% of them having graduate-level degrees compared with 56% of men.

Neighborhood committees of the CCP are often led by older women.

== Crimes against women ==
=== Domestic violence ===
In Henan in the 1980s, activist Liang Jun campaigned against domestic violence. In 2004, the All-China Women's Federation compiled survey results to show that thirty percent of families in China experienced domestic violence, with 16 percent of men having beaten their wives. In 2003, the percentage of women domestically abusing men increased, with 10 percent of familial violence involving male victims. The Chinese Marriage Law was amended in 2001 to offer mediation services and compensation to those who were subjected to domestic violence. The 2005 amendment of the Law of Protection of Rights and Interests of Women criminalized domestic violence. The lack of public awareness of the 2005 amendment contributed to the persistence of spousal abuse.

In 2022, China's highest court issued guidelines that make it easier for domestic violence victims to obtain personal protection orders. The guidelines broadens the definition of domestic violence to include additional conduct such as stalking, harassment, and verbal abuse; it also lowers the threshold for proof.

=== Women's safety ===
China is generally considered a safe place for women, having some of the lowest crime rates in the world. However, crime is systematically underreported and women continue to face discrimination in public and private spaces.

In recent years, with the rise of feminist voices on China's social media platforms, many incidences of violence were able to be reported. One of the incidences that triggered the most outrage and fear was 2022 Tangshan restaurant attack. On June 10, 2022, a group of men brutally assaulted four women at a barbecue restaurant in Lubei District, Tangshan at midnight. A drunken man, after his failed attempt to sexually harass a woman, was irritated and, along with his companions, violently attacked four women at the restaurant. As the report of the incidence and the restaurant's CCTV footage were uploaded online, they were quickly circulated.

The government officials, after the attack happened, initially offered self-contradictory accounts on the handling of suspects. In an interview with the newspaper The Paper on the afternoon of June 10, Tangshan Police claimed they had detained the suspects right after the incidence, while the secretary of Commission for Political and Legal Affairs of Tangshan said the police were still searching for the suspects. On June 11, all the suspects were detained.

A fierce public debate was also generated with regard to whether such attack was relevant to gender issues. Several Chinese authorities denied the significance of gender played in the attack, claiming it was about public security but not women's security specifically. And many believed the blame should be about these specific attackers rather than be generalized to "all man". However, many feminists disagreed with such view and were in outrage. They thought those voices essentially dismissed the origin of the attack being a failed attempt of sexual harassment towards women and underplayed the structural violence experienced by women in everyday life.

=== Foot binding ===
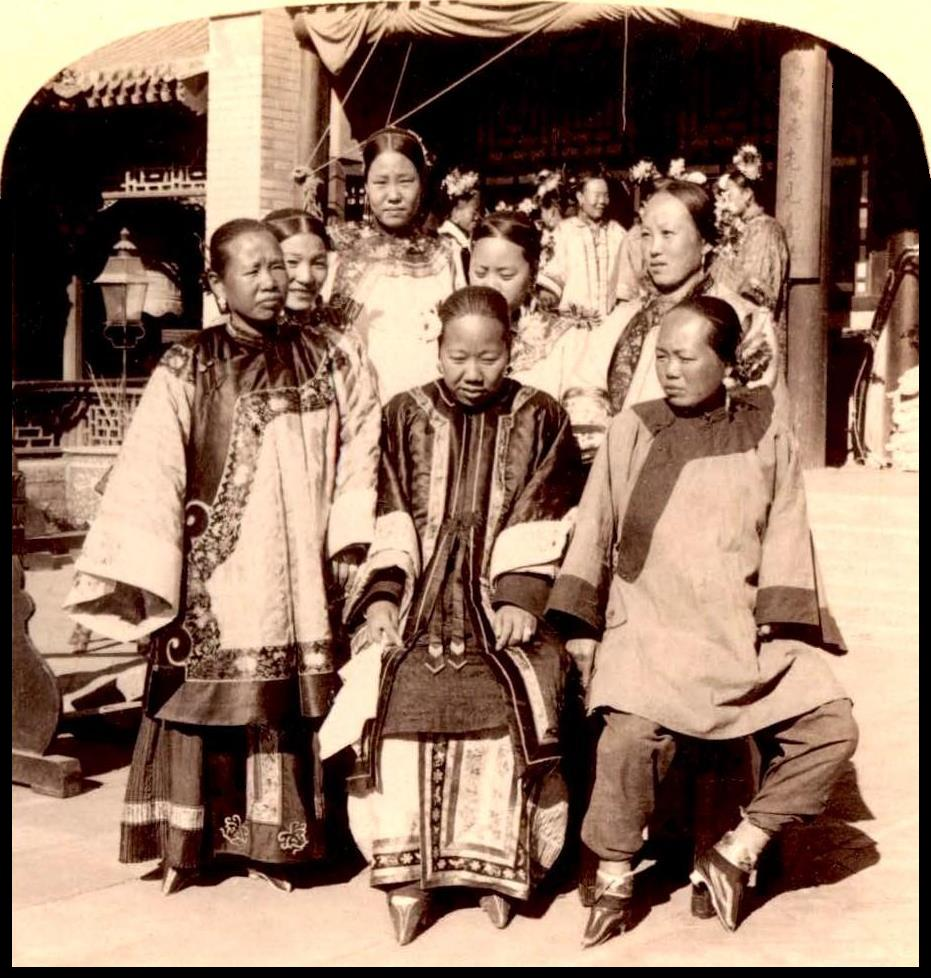
A group of women with bound feet in China, 1912

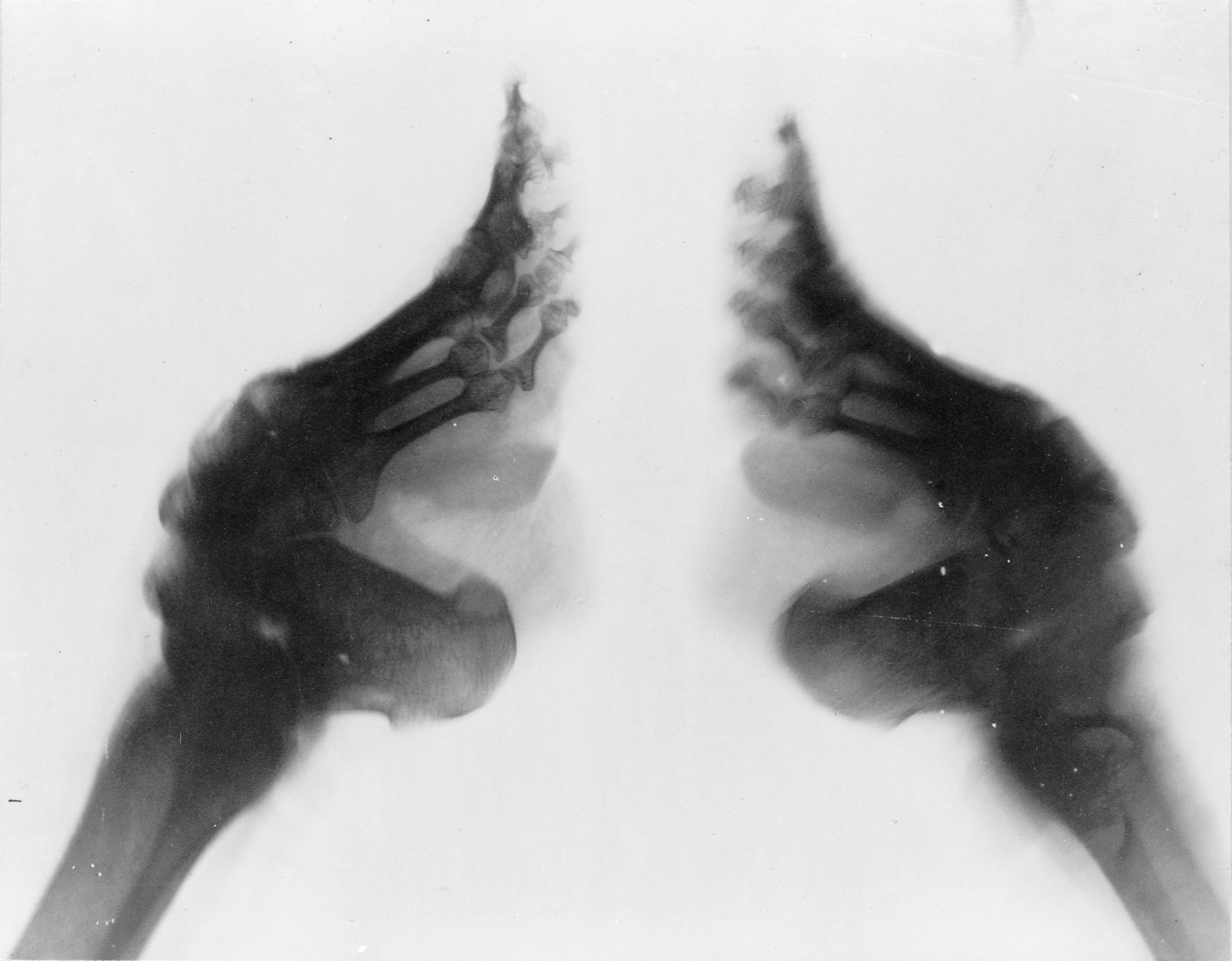
X-ray of bound feet

In 1912, following the fall of the Qing dynasty and the end of imperial rule, the Republican government outlawed foot binding, and popular attitudes toward the practice began to shift by the late nineteenth century. Footbound women became the symbol of a weak Chinese state. Colonialism greatly influenced the shifting attitudes among elite Chinese men surrounding foot binding. As commentators from the West denounced foot binding, "elite Chinese rapidly came to understand foot binding as barbaric, painful, harmful to women's health and childbearing, unscientific..." and more. Although outlawed, it continued to be practiced in many areas. In 1949, the practice of footbinding was successfully banned. According to Dorothy Y. Ko, bound feet can be seen as a footnote of "all that was wrong with traditional China: oppression of women, insularity, despotism, and disregard for human rights". However they can also be seen as female empowerment within a traditional patriarchal society.

=== Trafficking ===
In the 1950s, Mao Zedong, the Chairman of the Chinese Communist Party, launched a campaign to eradicate prostitution throughout China. The campaign made the act of trafficking women severely punishable by law. A major component was the rehabilitation program in which prostitutes and trafficked women were provided "medical treatment, thought reform, job training, and family reintegration". Since the economic reform in 1979, sex trafficking and other social vices have revived.

According to United Nations Inter-Agency Project On Human Trafficking (UNIAP), China is both the source and the destination for human trafficking. UNIAP reports shows, with the rise of inter-provincial migration within the country, Chinese women between 16 and 20 years are the main victims of trafficking. Southeastern provinces such as Yunnan and Guizhou are the main source provinces, while Fujian, Guangdong, and Shandong are the main destination provinces of trafficking. Cross-border trafficking of women is also prevalent in China. Many migrants from Vietnam, Russia, Korea and Myanmar are trafficked into China and sold for purposes such as commercial sexual exploitation and forced marriage. The huge market for human trafficking is partially due to the uneven gender ratio caused by the one-child policy. The increasing bachelors in China produces a high demand for bride trafficking. Women trafficked are kidnapped from their homes and sold to gangs who traffic women, often displacing them by great distances, making it difficult for them to escape. Men who purchase the women often do not allow them to leave the house, and take their documentation. Many women become pregnant and have children, and are burdened to provide for their family.

In recent years, China passed a number of laws against trafficking including the latest statement "Notice by the General Office of the State Council of Issuing China's Action Plan against Human Abduction and Trafficking (2021-2030)" released in 2021. However, recent trafficking cases such as the widespread Xuzhou chained woman incident have pose doubt on the effective enforcement of anti-trafficking laws in China. On January 28, 2022, a video showing a mentally traumatized woman chained to the wall in Fengxian, Xuzhou by her husband went viral on social platforms. The government initially released a statement claiming the woman was legally married to the husband. As the public's skepticism grew, the statement was overturned by the police investigative team, who verified it was in fact a case of human trafficking. The government later claimed to locate the true identity of the woman, although many were still highly skeptical of the result of official investigation. Wuyi, a volunteer who went to Xuzhou to further investigate by herself, has encountered state obstruction and been imprisoned ever since.

=== Prostitution ===
Shortly after taking power in 1949, the Chinese Communist Party embarked upon a series of campaigns that purportedly eradicated prostitution from mainland China by the early 1960s. Since the loosening of government controls over society in the early 1980s, prostitution in mainland China not only has become more visible, but also can now be found throughout both urban and rural areas. In spite of government efforts, prostitution has now developed to the extent that it comprises an industry involving a large number of people and producing a significant economic output.

Prostitution has also become associated with a number of problems, including organized crime, government corruption, and sexually transmitted diseases. Due to China's history of favoring sons over daughters in the family, there has been a disproportionately larger number of marriageable aged men unable to find available women, so some turn to prostitutes instead.

== See also ==
- Women in the Republic of China
- Feminism in China
- Feminism in Chinese Communism
- Globalization and women in China
- Urban society in the People's Republic of China
- Rural society in the People's Republic of China
- Women in ancient China
- Missing women of China
- Female infanticide in China
- Abortion in China
- Chinese patriarchy
- Chinese ideals of female beauty
- List of Chinese administrative divisions by gender ratio
- Concubinage in China
- New Marriage Law
- Prostitution in China
- Women in agriculture in China
- Chinese rural left behind women
- Women in China during the Second Sino-Japanese War
- Women in Asia
