= John Myers Swan =

American surgeon (1860–1919)

John Myers Swan (September 11, 1860 – November 11, 1919) was an American surgeon, a founding member of the China Medical Missionary Association, and a pioneer in medical missionary work in China. He served as the superintendent of Canton Hospital and was the first president of the South China Medical College. Swan contributed significantly to the development of modern medical practices in southern China and wrote for the China Medical Missionary Journal, focusing on topics such as opium addiction treatment and surgical advancements.

Throughout his 34 years of service in China, Swan played a crucial role in expanding Canton Hospital’s facilities and medical education, establishing it as a leading institution in East Asia. He was known for his dedication to patient care and medical education, overseeing thousands of surgeries and patients each year. His work had a lasting impact on the region's healthcare, earning him widespread recognition among both local and foreign communities.

== Personal life ==
John Myers Swan was born on September 11, 1860, in Glasgow, Ohio to Amanda Melvina Woolf Swan, age 27, and Reverend James Nesbit Swan, age 34. He was baptised 4 Feb 1861 in Wellsville, Ohio, at Yellow Creek Presbyterian Church. His father served as a minister in Eastern Ohio for 55 years and was particularly dedicated to taking care of the sick through his home missionary work. John Myers Swan was one of ten children born to his parents and the third out of eight surviving children as his two eldest sisters died in infancy.

He married Arminta "Minta" Hickman in Calcutta, Ohio, on July 16, 1885, when he was 24 years old. They had three children together. Their eldest son James Hickman was born on September 13, 1890, in Taiwan. His second son Charles Arthur was born on December 24, 1891, in Guangdong, China. His youngest son Robert Creighton was born on April 27, 1902, in China.

== Early life ==
Early in his life, he desired to engage in the study of medicine, but there were major barriers in the way before him. With the aim of realizing his aspiration, he worked in a grocery store during the day while spending his evenings in study under the guidance of a general practitioner. When he was ready to go into a medical college, he went to New York, where he lived a life of great frugality. He graduated from New York University Medical College, Univ. of City of New York in 1885. It was his wish to serve humankind, and so he became interested in the work of medical missions. He applied to the American Presbyterian Board of Foreign Missions for a position and set off to China with his wife in the fall of 1885.

== Missionary service (1885–1919) ==
=== Canton Hospital ===
Swan arrived in Canton (modern-day Guangzhou) in December 1885 as part of the American Presbyterian Mission, spending a year studying Cantonese to immerse himself in the local language and culture. In 1887, he began his medical career as an assistant to Dr. Kerr at Canton Hospital.

From 1891 to 1910, Swan served as the hospital’s main surgeon and superintendent. Under his leadership, Canton Hospital expanded its facilities, becoming the largest hospital in East Asia, with 300 beds, 30,000 patients treated annually, and 2,000 surgeries performed each year. Swan played a key role in modernizing the hospital, setting up its first antiseptic unit, and establishing proper operating room procedures. His work modernizing the hospital led to a split with Kerr who believed the mission should be evangelization more than modern medical care. This led Kerr ot leave the hospital in 1899. Swan's wife also contributed by supervising the hospital kitchen, which improved patient dietetics significantly.\

=== Canton Medical Missionary Society ===
He was also a founding member of the China Medical Missionary Association, which sought to promote medical science among the Chinese, provide mutual assistance for medical missionaries, and advance the integration of mission work and medical science.

=== South China Medical College (for men) ===
The founding of the South China Medical College for Men in Canton was largely attributed to the efforts of Dr. Swan, then superintendent of the Canton Hospital.

The Canton Hospital began educating students prior to 1879 as the Presbyterian South China Medical College. Under John Kerr, the training program admitted women starting in 1879. When Kerr left Canton Hospital in 1899, a conflict over educating female students led to Mary Hannah Fulton and Myers starting separate medical colleges based on gender.

In 1901, the Canton Hospital hosted 40 students alongside two foreign and eight Chinese teachers. By 1902, three years into Swan's leadership, the development of a formal design for a medical college began. A report submitted to the Medical Missionary Society highlighted the goal to establish a "properly organized medical college for men.". Fulton in 1901 established the Kwangtung Medical School for Women which became Hackett Medical College for Women.

On January 15, 1902, under Dr. Swan's guidance, the Canton Medical Missionary Society voted to establish the South China Medical College(for men), appointing a special committee on organization and equipment chaired by American Consul Robert M. McWade. The college was administered by the Medical Missionary Society, and Dr. Swan was appointed its first president.

=== Hillcrest Hospital ===
After leaving Canton Hospital in 1910, Swan established a private hospital in an eastern suburb of Canton, where he continued to practice medicine independently. His medical missionary son Charles Arthur Swan took over the Hillcrest Hospital on Swan's death.

== Death ==
Swan died as the result of a motor vehicle accident with a truck in Pittsburgh, Pennsylvania, on 11 November 1919.

== Publications ==
- Swan, John M., and Robert M. McWade. "CHINA. A Report of the Treatment of Leprosy in Canton as Conducted by Dr. Adolph Razlag, of Vienna University." Public Health Reports (1896-1970), vol. 17, no. 32, 1902, pp. 1840–41. JSTOR, http://www.jstor.org/stable/41473349. Accessed 8 Jan. 2025.
- Swan, John M. "CHINA. Further Report Concerning Experiments in Treating Leprosy." Public Health Reports (1896-1970), vol. 17, no. 32, 1902, pp. 1839–40. JSTOR, http://www.jstor.org/stable/41473348. Accessed 8 Jan. 2025.
- McWade, Robert M., and John M. Swan. “CHINA. Cholera in Canton.” Public Health Reports (1896-1970), vol. 17, no. 17, 1902, pp. 951–53. JSTOR, http://www.jstor.org/stable/41469798. Accessed 8 Jan. 2025.
- Swan, John M., and Robert M. McWade. “CHINA. Quarantine Restrictions of Dutch Indian Government on Vessels from Canton.” Public Health Reports (1896-1970), vol. 17, no. 28, 1902, pp. 1648–1648. JSTOR, http://www.jstor.org/stable/41470461. Accessed 8 Jan. 2025.
- Hay, John, et al. “CHINA. Experiments Being Made at Canton in the Treatment of Leprosy Cases.” Public Health Reports (1896-1970), vol. 17, no. 30, 1902, pp. 1743–44. JSTOR, http://www.jstor.org/stable/41473287. Accessed 8 Jan. 2025.
- Hay, John, et al. “CHINA. Report from Canton—Cholera and Plague in Province of Kwangtung.” Public Health Reports (1896-1970), vol. 17, no. 27, 1902, pp. 1576–78. JSTOR, http://www.jstor.org/stable/41470403. Accessed 8 Jan. 2025.
- McWade, Robert M., and John M. Swan. “CHINA. Plague and Cholera in Canton—Precautions against Spread.” Public Health Reports (1896-1970), vol. 17, no. 23, 1902, pp. 1315–17. JSTOR, http://www.jstor.org/stable/41470168. Accessed 8 Jan. 2025.
- Cridler, Thos. W., et al. “CHINA. Plague in the Province of Kwangtung, Including Canton.” Public Health Reports (1896-1970), vol. 16, no. 34, 1901, pp. 1941–47. JSTOR, http://www.jstor.org/stable/41458948. Accessed 8 Jan. 2025.
- John M. Swan. "South China Medical College." Chinese Medical Journal, vol. 25, no. 5, 1909, pp. 303–308. MedNexus, https://mednexus.org/toc/cmj/23/05. Assessed 8 Jan 2025.
