= Women in agriculture in China =

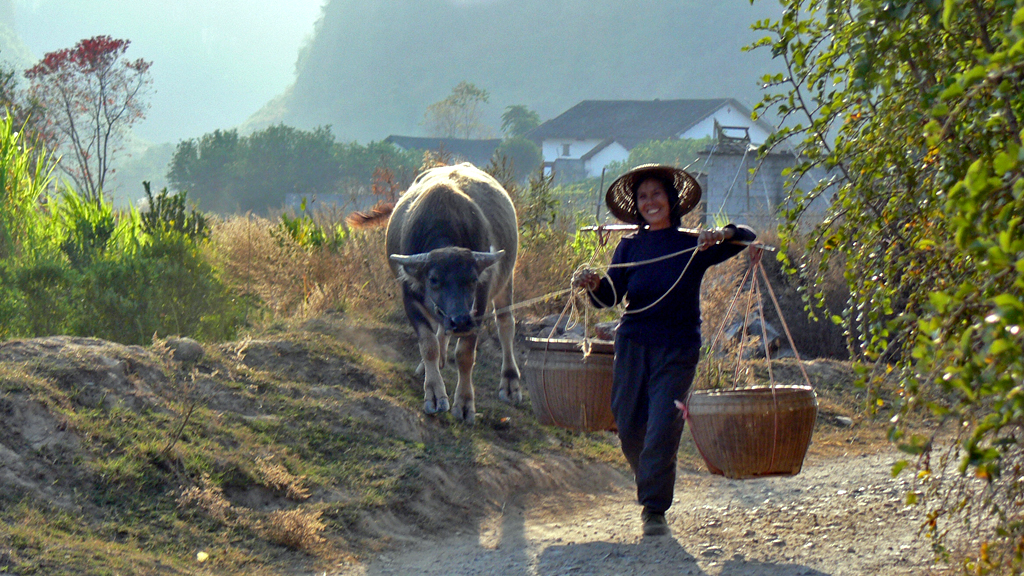
Farmer with a buffalo near Yangshou, 2007.

Women in agriculture in the People's Republic of China make up a diverse group of women who support agricultural activities in their country. The experiences of rural women in China vary significantly by region, with a variety of economic strategies derived from local conditions and family structures.

== History ==
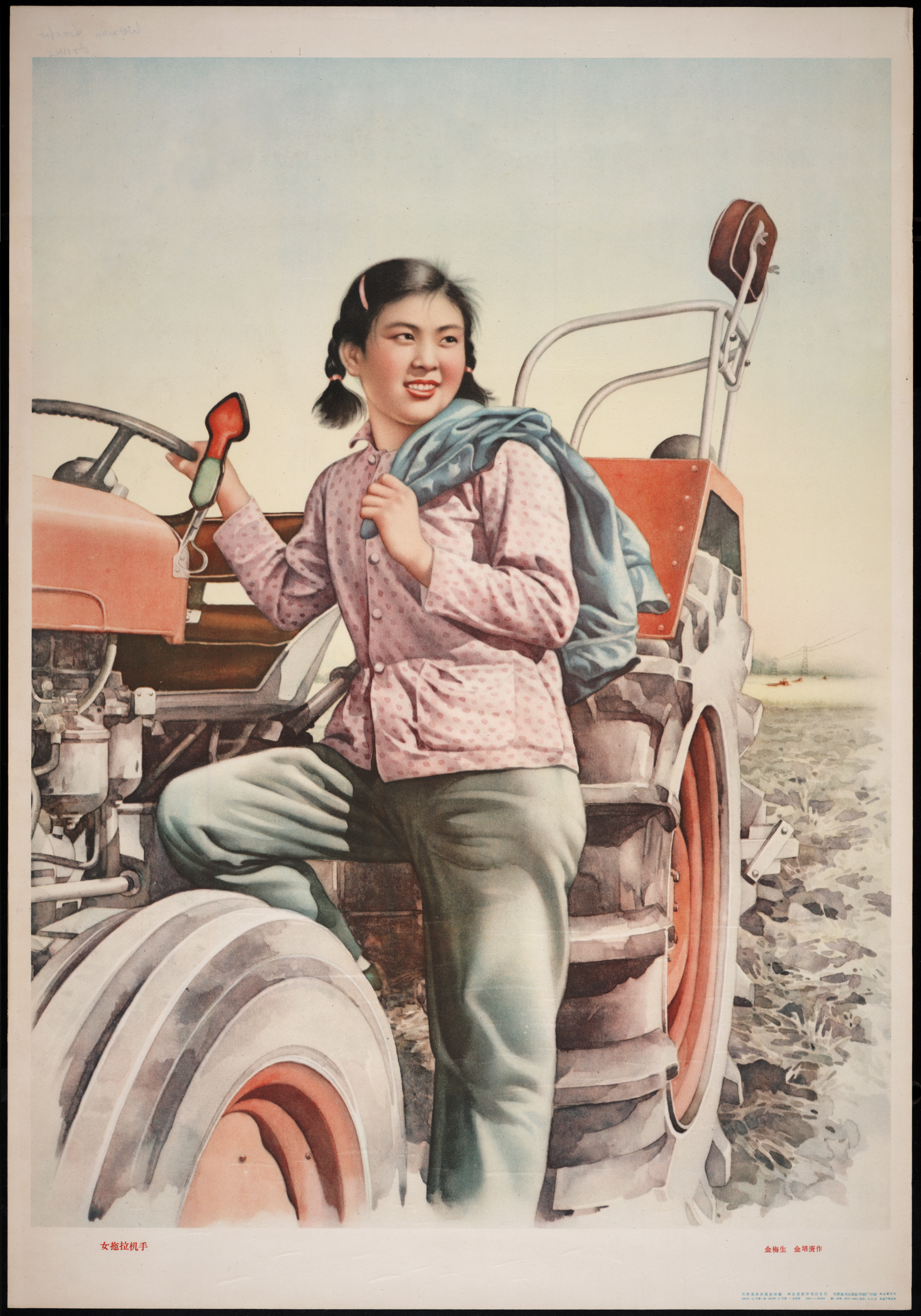
Woman tractor driver in China depicted in a 1964 poster.

Based on Confucian principles, farming was an expression of "moral worth" for men of all social classes in China while weaving and creating textiles was a way for women to show their worth in society. Traditionally, "women were subordinated to men," and although men had primary responsibility for the farm, women were certainly involved in farming in the early Chinese economy. During the Han dynasty, women's contributions to agriculture in China increased, most likely due to the innovation and popularization of the pit-farming method. Textile creation, which relied on help and silk, was also considered by early Chinese to be an "agricultural product" rather than a separate craft.

Prior to the Chinese Communist Revolution, small family farms where women contributed to farm and house work made up the majority of agriculture in China. Women's contributions to the family farm were often overlooked by early twentieth century scholars because women's work was not recognized by men and not reported in economic surveys. Women also did not have land rights in pre-revolutionary China.

As China went through the reform, the farm sector became a powerful force in the economy. Beginning in 1943, the Communist Party publicized the efforts of female model workers in agriculture. The Constitution of the People's Republic of China makes the provision that women are equal to men, but in practice, traditional gender roles have persisted where men are considered "superior to women." After 1949, the Chinese government strongly encouraged women's participation in agriculture.

During the 1980s, China went through a "decollectivization of agriculture," as part of the household responsibility system (HRS) which caused individual households to "undertake a vast majority of agricultural production." HRS also contributed to a greater amount of commercialization in Chinese agriculture. Women's ability to own land was again affected by the HRS, which began to discourage women who had married from filing readjustments to land-ownership, making married women "effectively landless."

By the mid-1990s, 80% of Chinese women lived in rural areas and were doing approximately 70 to 80 percent of the farm work, in addition to caring for family members. After this, however, women's contribution to farm work began to fall and by 2000 had dropped below 51 percent. During this time period, village governments counted women as fully "part of the village labor force," and did not keep separate records for men's and women's labor. The number of women involved in migrant farm work has risen steadily since the 1980s, only 1% of women were earning money as migrant workers, in 2000 that number rose to 7%. In 2000, women made up 59% of livestock activities.

== Modern farms ==
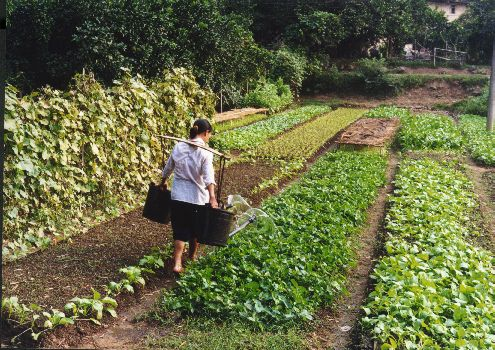
A woman farming in Yangshuo, 2005.

Today, agriculture remains a "dominant occupation in China." However, 13 different provinces of China "issued policy documents that require the protection of women's equal rights to land in the registration process." The problem of women's land rights involves the fact that most married women's land rights "are retained in their natal households." In addition, a survey taken after 2012 found that "only 17.1 percent of existing land contracts and 38.2 percent of existing land certificates include women's names.

Women entrepreneurs in agriculture have been enabled by new market forces to start their own businesses. Shared Harvest, opened in 2012 by Shi Yan, is an organic farm and one of the first farms to take part in the Community Supported Agriculture (CSA) model. Trends towards buying CSA foods, such as consumers wanting more organic produce or rejecting the industrialization of agriculture, has helped grow more CSA farms in China.

== See also ==
- Agriculture in China
- Chinese rural left behind women
- Women in China
