= Feminism in Chinese communism =

The Chinese Communist Party (CCP) was founded in China in 1921. As a Marxist–Leninist party, it viewed class as the fundamental source of the oppression of women, and contended that women's liberation was only possible in a socialist society that had eliminated private ownership and traditional sources of oppression against women. As the CCP grew and began governing parts of China, it enacted women's rights measures including laws which mandated that marriage must be freely and voluntarily entered into; it prohibited traditional practices like arranged marriages, concubinage, child marriage, and bride buying and selling.

After the founding of the People's Republic of China in 1949, the CCP implemented legislation decide to advance equality between men and women. It sought to recognize women's contributions, stating in the Mao Zedong-attributed principle that "Women hold up half the sky". During the Land Reform Movement, the CCP viewed women as important mobilizers, observing that peasant women had been among the most oppressed people within the "old society". The Great Leap Forward's emphasis on total workforce mobilization provided opportunities for women's advancement in labor, including the promotion of Iron Girls as model workers who excelled at types of work traditionally viewed as men's work.

Historically, the CCP criticized liberal feminism as bourgeois, narrow, and beneficial primarily to elite women, viewing gender oppression as class-driven, in a Marxist framework. During the Xi Jinping era, a trend among nationalists is the characterization of liberal feminism on the internet as a toxic Western ideology and a threat to the country's demographics. The government has shut down various liberal feminist non-governmental organizations and censored online platforms.

== Early 1900s ==
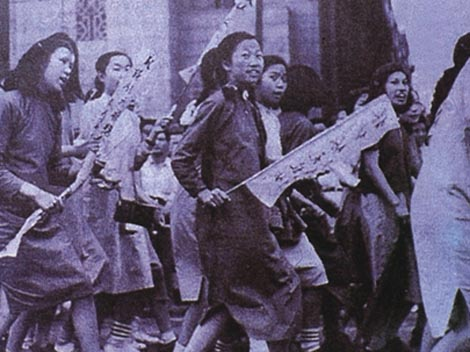
Female students participate in demonstration as part of the 1919 May Fourth Movement.

In the 1910s and 1920s, the May Fourth Movement advocated for more equality between women and men, more educational opportunities for women, and female emancipation. This era was more open and accommodating to feminism than the eras that followed it. The movement, however, only affected a small number of elite women who lived in urban areas and its impact on most women who lived in rural areas of China was minimal. Arranged marriages were common at the time. The only way that women could initiate a divorce was by suicide, whereas men could choose divorce for various reasons.

Arising in the Marxist tradition, the CCP viewed class as the fundamental source of gender oppression. It held that women's liberation could only be fully achieved in a socialist society that had eliminated private ownership and the traditional practices that had kept women in an inferior position in society. This perspective deemed liberal feminism as narrow, bourgeois, and primarily of benefit to elite women.

By the 1920s, the communist movement in China used a labor and peasant organizing strategy that combined workplace advocacy with women's rights advocacy. The CCP would lead union organizing efforts among male workers while simultaneously working in nearby peasant communities on women's rights issues, including literacy for women. Mao Zedong and Yang Kaihui were among the most effective CCP political organizers using this method. Poor peasant women, in particular, became strong supporters of CCP programs.

Among the major leaders of the women's movement in China during the 1920s, both with the CCP and more broadly, was Xiang Jingyu. The Nationalist government executed her on 1 May 1929 during a purge targeting the CCP and its supporters.

At the 3rd National Congress of the Chinese Communist Party, it passed the Resolution about the Women's Movement, which Xiang had drafted. The CCP's resolution emphasized the importance of women workers' movements and stated that shared anti-warlord and anti-imperialist themes could unite the various women's movements in China such as the feminist movement, the women's suffrage movement, and the movement to abolish prostitution.

During the Chinese Civil War, the CCP enacted women's rights measures in areas of the country it controlled. Orders issued by the Red Army's soviet governments advanced the freedom to divorce and marry, liberating women from feudal marriages and resulting in women's strong support for the revolution. In the revolutionary base area of Jiangxi, the CCP enacted the Marriage Regulations of 1931 and the Marriage Laws of 1941, which were modeled after Soviet Union statutes. These statutes declared marriage as a free association between a woman and a man without the interference of other parties and permitted divorce on mutual agreement. They abolished practices like child brides and early-age marriages, arranged marriages, concubinage, bride-buying, and wife-selling. At the time, they were the most progressive marriage laws in China and created the conditions for women to divorce men they had been forced to marry, leave abusive spouses, and till their own land.

As part of their strategy to use art as a medium for its political messages, the CCP became active in Shanghai's film industry. Films with themes of women's liberation that were produced as a result of this strategy included the 1935 film Children of Troubled Times, the theme song of which (The March of the Volunteers) became the PRC's national anthem.

The leading CCP journal on women's issues was Women's Life, which sought to advance a united front for women. In response to the Nationalists' New Life Movement, which promoted an ideal of the "wise wife and good mother" who should return to the home, Women's Life condemned the idea of pushing women back into the home as a Hitler-esque attempt at control and an approach which would serve the interests of foreign imperialism.

In 1939, Mao Zedong proposed creating a women's university where the CCP could develop female cadres. The Chinese Women's University was inaugurated on 20 July of that year in Yan'an, and Mao's inauguration speech emphasized the role of women in resisting the Japanese invasion of China. Mao stated, "The day all women in China rise up is the moment of China's revolutionary victory!"

In 1942, Guo Moruo's essay The Answer to Nora was published in New China Daily. Guo's essay responded to Lu Xun's question "what happens after Nora"—the principal character in Henrik Ibsen's play A Doll's House -- "leaves home?". Writing that Nora should emulate the revolutionary martyr Qiu Jin, Guo stated, "Where should Nora go after she leaves the doll's house? She should study and acquire the skills to live independently; fight to achieve women's emancipation in the context of national liberation; take on women's responsibilities in national salvation; and not fear sacrificing her life to accomplish these tasks -- these are the right answers."

On 1 February 1940, the Central Committee of the Chinese Communist Party instructed that for International Women's Day, local party branches should emphasize the need for women across social classes to unite in opposition to those who collaborated with the invading Japanese. In the 1940s, one of the major themes of the women's movement in Yan'an was to denounce Chen Bijun, the wife Japanese collaborator Wang Jingwei.

For International Women's Day in 1942, Bai Shuang wrote in an essay for Jiefang Daily that women's independence and contentment could only be achieved by leaving the home, being employed, participating in social activities, and contributing to the defense against the Japanese invasion.

In his essay, On "Virtuous Wife and Good Mother", Zhou Enlai wrote that motherhood should not be a pretext to keep women from pursuing professions and that motherhood should be promoted with principles of gender equality.

In February 1943, the CCP issued its Decision of the Central Committee Concerning the Present Direction of Women's Work in Anti-Japanese Base Areas. The Decision contended that efforts to mobilize women had been lacking in "mass perspective" and it was necessary to organize women in cooperative groups to effectively mobilize their labor power. Establishing small cooperative weaving groups outside the home was a significant emphasis.

During the Civil War, rural women were at the forefront of providing care to the dependents of men who fought in the Red Army, particularly through Women's Associations.

Academic Lin Chun writes, "Women's liberation had been highlighted in the communist agenda from the outset and, in that sense, the Chinese revolution was simultaneously a women's revolution, and Chinese socialism a women's cause."

== Mao era (1949–1976) ==
The People's Republic of China included gender equality in its constitution from inception. Its view of state-led women's liberation was implemented through laws reinforcing gender equality in politics, economics, culture, education, and social and family matters. To further develop policy and represent women's interests, it formed the All-China Women's Federation. After the founding of the PRC in 1949, newly established local governments continued to prioritize women's political mobilization. The famous quote from Mao Zedong, reported to have been uttered in 1968, reflects the commitment of the new government of the People's Republic of China: "Women hold up half the sky".

In the 1950s, high-level female CCP cadre had a significant role in advocating for greater access to abortion and sterilization surgeries—in their view, women could not "hold up half the sky" nor advance their revolutionary work if they had too many children. Women workers on the mobile film projection teams which brought cinema to rural China were promoted as model workers and symbols of advancing gender equality.

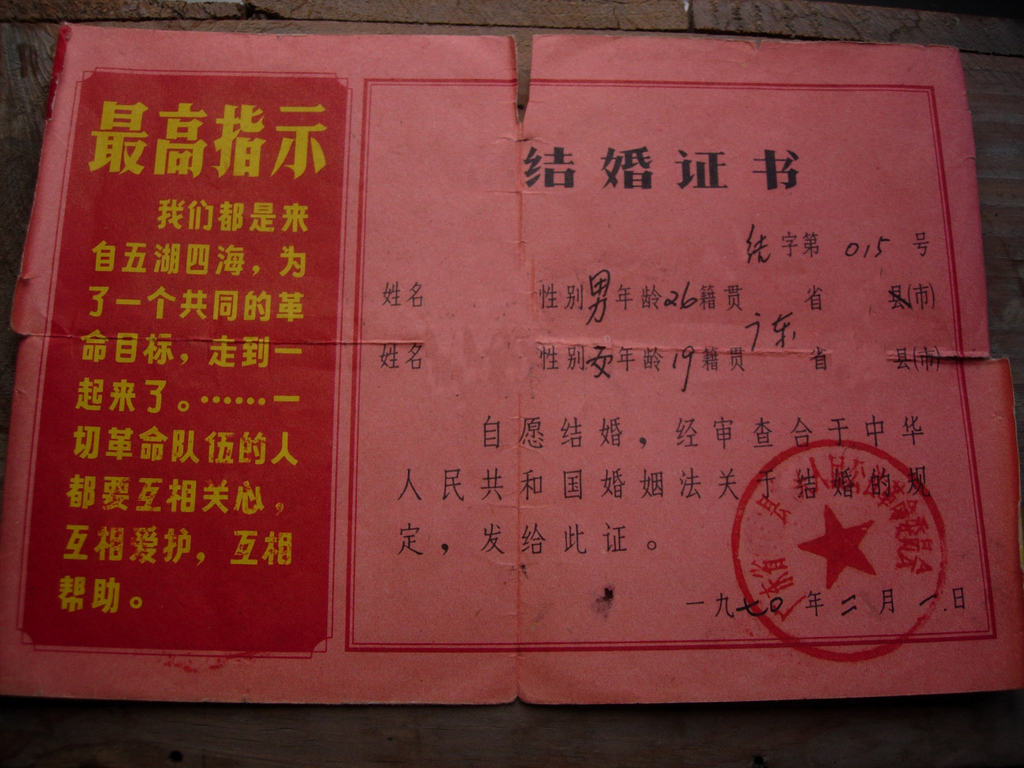
A marriage certificate from 1970, after the Marriage Law was put into place, stating that the couple is marrying voluntarily

=== Legislation ===
In 1950, the CCP adopted two pieces of legislative law to help bring about gender equality. First, the Marriage Law outlawed prostitution, arranged marriage, child betrothal, and concubinage. Free marriage and divorce were heavily advocated by the government, along with economic independence for women. Second, the Land Law attempted to mobilize women to participate in the labor force by relocating them from rural to urban areas. A concentration of female-oriented labor occurred in the production of textile, silk, and other light industries.

=== Response to legislation ===
In 1953, the government realized that the Marriage and Land Law had received large pushback from male members of society. The economy could also no longer handle the large amount of the labor force that it had mobilized. Murder and suicide rates among women who wished to terminate their marriage also reached a new high. For the next few years, the CCP focused more on overall societal stability and emphasized more domestic values for women to support a peaceful home life.

=== Land reform movement ===
During China's land reform movement (which began after the defeat of the Japanese in the Second Sino-Japanese War and continued in the early years of the People's Republic of China), the CCP encouraged rural women in achieving a "double fanshen" - a revolutionary transformation as both a peasant and a feminist awakening as a woman. The CCP urged rural women to reject traditional Chinese assumptions about their role in society. In conjunction with land reform, the movement promoted women's issues such as the elimination of bride prices and reversing the stigma against widows remarrying. The CCP promoted successes in women's liberation, such as the progress of the Hui women of northwest China who were said to have not just received land through the rural movement, but also "freedom over their own bodies" and embraced political participation. The CCP also publicized reports of individual women activists, such as Guo Suzhen, a Liaoning woman who was first mobilized during a 1947 mass mobilization campaign.

Rural women had a significant impact on China's land reform movement, with the CCP making specific efforts to mobilize them for agrarian revolution. CCP activists observed that because peasant women were less tied to old power structures, they more readily opposed those identified as class enemies. In 1947, Deng Yingchao emphasized at a land reform policy meeting that "women function as great mobilizers when they speak bitterness." The All-China Women's Federation issued a call to CCP activists to encourage peasant women to understand their "special bitterness" from a class perspective. Women activists helped peasant women prepare to speak in public, including by roleplaying as landlords to help such women practice.

=== Great Leap Forward ===
In October 1958, Mao stated that if the people's communes were run well, "there is a thorough road for women's liberation. The People's communes are carrying out a wage system and a supply system under which wages are paid to each individual, not to the family head. This makes women and young people happy, and it's a way of smashing the patriarchal system, and the ideology of bourgeois right."

In the late 1950s, Shanghai established neighborhood committees to promote women's literacy, birth planning, and women's employment. Workers from these neighborhood committees went door-to-door to address individual concerns about birth control. This method was adopted in other cities by the early 1960s and expanded to the establishment of local birth planning offices.

The Great Leap Forward's focus on total workforce mobilization resulted in opportunities for women's labor advancement. As women became increasingly needed to work in agriculture and industry, and encouraged by policy to do so, the phenomenon of Iron Women arose. Women did traditionally male work in both fields and factories, including major movements of women into management positions. Women competed for high productivity, and those who distinguished themselves came to be called Iron Women. Slogans such as "There is no difference between men and women in this new age" and "We can do anything, and anything we do, we can do it well" became popular.

Despite that the Great Leap Forward Movement ultimately resulted in a devastating famine, it paved the way for women's labor force participation during the Cultural Revolution period.

=== Cultural Revolution ===
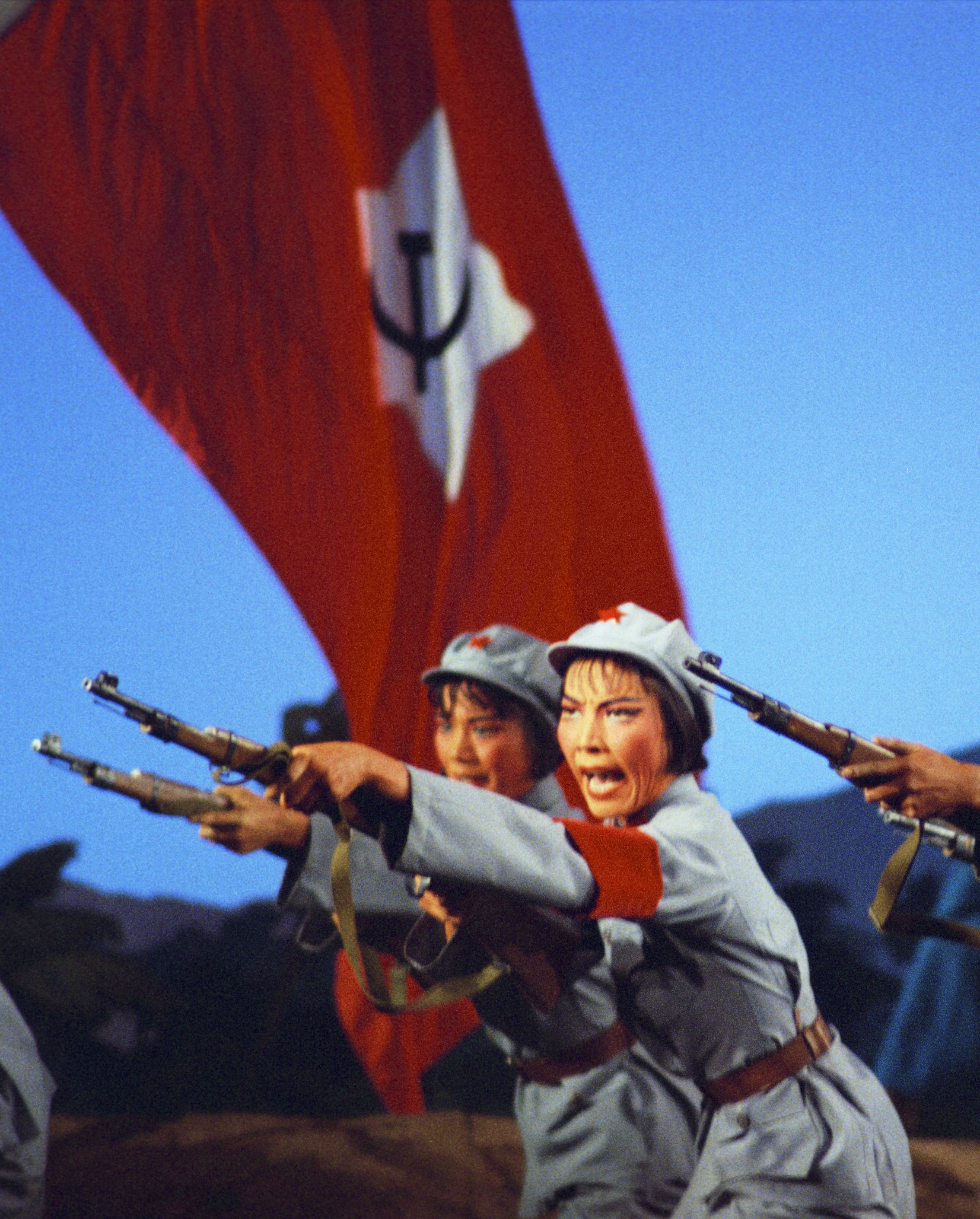
Depiction of women as soldiers during the Chinese Cultural Revolution.

The Cultural Revolution period beginning in 1966 brought prosperous economic development as women's labor force participation remained high. Further, women's representation in higher educational settings was also higher compared to previous and future time periods. However, women still suffered a lower status in Chinese culture. During this time, the All Women's Federation was also forced to suspend itself, an indication that female priorities were considered less important on the political agenda.

During the Cultural Revolution, one way China promoted its policy of state feminism was through revolutionary operas developed by Mao's wife Jiang Qing. Most of the eight model dramas in this period featured women as their main characters. The narratives of these women protagonists begin with them oppressed by misogyny, class position, and imperialism before liberating themselves through the discovery of their own internal strength and the CCP.

The Cultural Revolution often ignored women's issues, and considered them no different from men without considering their lower status. Women were often depicted as strong capable warriors who fought in the name of communism and China in propaganda posters. In many cases during the introduction of the Red Guard, women felt the need to be a leading force. This resulted in numerous women at schools being beaten and humiliated by their peers if they did not live up to communist standards. Despite being depicted as strong and proud, unequal treatment for women was still relevant in the 1960s. Many women who completed their educational requirements were still assigned poorer jobs while their male counterparts received better quality jobs. After the elimination of the assigned work units and the ability to migrate from the countryside to urban areas became available, many girls started living outside of the traditional sense that was still practiced in the rural areas. These girls were later known as the factory girls due to their work in poor conditioned factories.

== Post-Mao period to the 2000s ==
Following the 1970s, tremendous success was brought by the reform movements to China's economy, however, this did not equally impact the status of women. Unequal employment opportunities and income distribution have become such large issues that the United Nations Development Program has allocated specific funds to aid women who are laid-off from their jobs. Prostitution has also become an issue, especially in urban areas, as well as an increasing divorce rate. Women in rural areas are worse off compared to women in urban areas because of the lack of market economy present in rural cities.

On the other hand, benefits to women include increased educational opportunities such as women's studies programs and academic scholarships. The Center for Women's Studies in China was established at Zhengzhou University in 1987, along with many other women's programs and research centers.

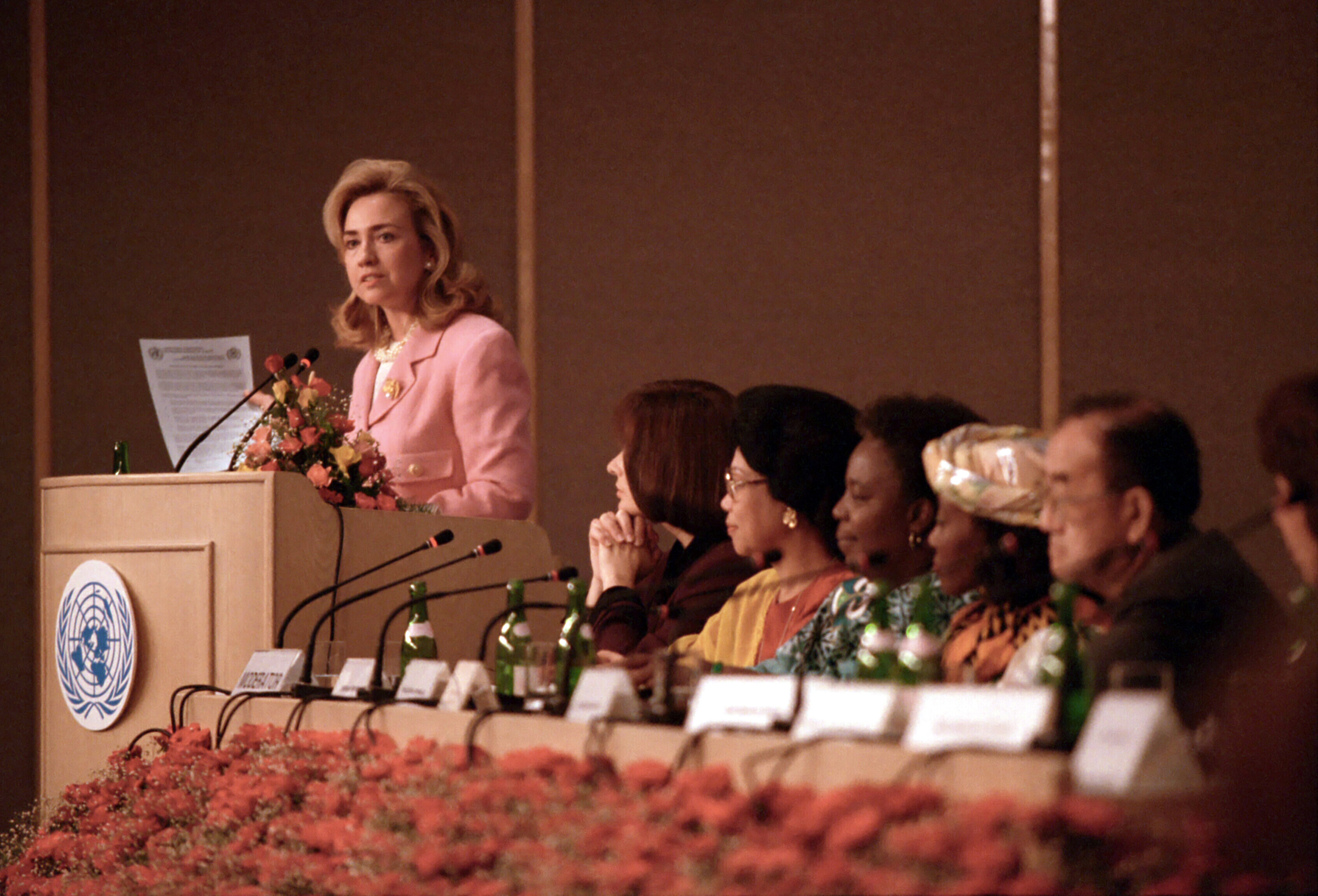
First Lady Hillary Rodham Clinton delivering a speech at the 1995 United Nations Conference on Women in Beijing. She notably said: "If there is one message that echoes forth from this conference, let it be that human rights are women's rights and women's rights are human rights, once and for all."

In 1995, the Fourth United Nations Conference on Women held in Beijing marked a turning point for Chinese feminism. This time period in the aftermath of the 1989 Tiananmen Square protests and massacre saw a limit in spontaneously organized activism as ordered by the Chinese government. Instead, Chinese feminists published numerous articles in mainstream media, especially in the Women's Federation newspaper Chinese Women's Daily. Chinese women's non-governmental organizations served as a crucial lever to open social spaces and allow for activism.

== 21st century ==
Gender inequality is still an issue in China in rural areas, despite the improvement of women's rights during Mao's era. Even in the 21st century, men have more access to social resources and high socioeconomic status, due to the existing prevalence of patriarchal values in Chinese society. The gender gap is wider in rural areas, where one ninth of the population still lives.

Post-Mao CCP leaders such as former general secretary Zhao Ziyang vigorously opposed the participation of women in the political process. Within the CCP, a glass ceiling still exists that prevents women from rising into the most important positions.

=== Xi Jinping ===
Under the general secretaryship of Xi Jinping, the gains of women have dropped compared to previous leaders. Feminists have been subject to increased scrutiny by the country's system of mass surveillance and censorship, and detained in some instances. After witnessing the growing feminist movements in China, the government under Xi shut down many activist NGOs and censored feminist platforms. Feminism has been viewed by nationalists as a toxic Western ideology and a threat to the country's declining demographics. In 2022, the Communist Youth League of China declared that "[e]xtreme feminism has become a poisonous tumour on the Internet." CCP General Secretary Xi Jinping has promoted pro-natalist policies and encouraged women to "actively foster a new type of marriage and childbearing culture." Specific policies have included lengthening of paid maternity leave, cash payments to mothers in some regions who have their second and third children. Local government family-planning committees, previously used to enforce the one-child policy, are deployed for pro-natalist policies such as calling women to check on their menstrual cycle.

== See also ==
- Chinese New Left
- Feminism in China
- History of the Chinese Communist Party
