= List of states and union territories of India by sex ratio =

Map indicating the human sex ratio by country. Countries with more females than males Countries with more males than females Countries with very similar proportions of males and females (to 3 significant figures, i.e., 1.00 males to 1.00 females) No data

Sex ratio is used to describe the ratio of females to males in a population. In India, the sex ratio has been estimated via a number of methods and data sets including the decennial censuses, the National Family Health Surveys (NFHS), the Civil Registration System, the Sample Registration System and the Health Management Information System. In 2014, the ratio of female births per 1000 male births varied from 887 to 918 using these estimates. According to the NFHS-4 (2015–16) sex ratio of the total population (females per 1,000 males) was 991 (with an urban ratio of 956 and a rural ratio of 1,009).

In 2011–2013, it was revealed through a population census with the Sample Registration System (SRS) that the sex ratio of India was 909 females per 1000 of males. It has skewed downwards from then, recording 900 females in 2013–2015 and 896 in 2015–17 per 1000 of males. Furthermore, that survey conducted with the SRS also showed Chhattisgarh as the highest sex ratio at 961, while Haryana was recorded the lowest at 831.

Sex ratio in India for census years 1931 to 2011 (in blue). The urban sex ratio (red) between 1951 and 2011 is consistently lower than the rural sex ratio (orange). The green line is the estimate of sex ratio at birth according to the National Family Health Survey 4.

The male-skew in India's sex ratio has increased since the early 20th century. In 1901 there were 3.2 million fewer women than men in India, but by the 2001 Census the disparity had increased by more than a factor of 10, to 35 million. This increase has been variously attributed to female infanticide, selective abortions (aided by increasing access to prenatal sex discernment procedures), and female child neglect. It has been suggested that the motivation for this selection against female children is due to the lower status and perceived usefulness of women in India's patriarchal society.

== Ranking of states and union territories ==
Map showing the sex ratio of each district in India based on the 2001 census data.

In the table below, the rank numbers represented by 'S' are for states while 'UT' are for union territories. The data in the table is based on the population census of 2001 and 2011.

No.	State/ Union Territory	NHFS-5		2011 Census		2001 Census		Change (2001 to 2011)	
No.	State/ Union Territory	Rank (Sex ratio at birth)	Sex ratio at birth	Sex ratio	Child sex ratio	Sex ratio (Note: "Child sex ratio" is the ratio of girls to boys in the age group of 0–6 years.)	Child sex ratio	Sex ratio	Child sex ratio
1	Lakshadweep	UT1	1051	947	911	948	959	▼ (−1)	▼ (−48)
2	Tripura	S1	1028	960	957	948	966	▲ (12)	▼ (−9)
3	Meghalaya	S2	989	989	970	972	973	▲ (17)	▼ (−3)
4	Uttarakhand	S3	984	963	890	962	908	▲ (1)	▼ (−18)
5	Arunachal Pradesh	S4	979	938	972	893	964	▲ (45)	▲ (8)
6	Karnataka	S5	978	973	948	965	946	▲ (8)	▲ (2)
7	Jammu and Kashmir (Note: At the time of the census, Jammu and Kashmir was a state but from 31 October 2019, it has been split into two union territories, namely Jammu and Kashmir and Ladakh.)	UT2	976	889	862	892	941	▼ (−3)	▼ (−79)
8	West Bengal	S6	973	950	956	934	960	▲ (16)	▼ (−4)
9	Mizoram	S7	969	976	970	935	964	▲ (41)	▲ (6)
10	Sikkim	S8	969	890	957	875	963	▲ (15)	▼ (−6)
11	Manipur	S9	967	992	930	978	957	▲ (14)	▼ (−27)
12	Assam	S10	964	958	962	935	965	▲ (23)	▼ (−3)
13	Chhattisgarh	S11	960	991	969	989	975	▲ (2)	▼ (−6)
14	Puducherry	UT3	959	1037	967	1001	967	▲ (36)	Steady
15	Madhya Pradesh	S12	956	931	918	919	932	▲ (12)	▼ (−14)
16	Gujarat	S13	955	919	890	920	883	▼ (−1)	▲ (7)
17	Kerala	S14	951	1084	964	1058	960	▲ (26)	▲ (4)
18	Nagaland	S15	945	931	943	900	964	▲ (31)	▼ (−21)
19	Uttar Pradesh	S16	941	912	902	898	916	▲ (14)	▼ (−14)
20	Andhra Pradesh	S17	934	993	939	978	961	▲ (15)	▼ (−22)
	India		929	943	919	933	927	▲ (10)	▼ (−8)
21	Delhi	UT4	923	868	871	821	868	▲ (47)	▲ (3)
22	Andaman and Nicobar Islands	UT5	914	876	968	846	957	▲ (30)	▲ (11)
23	Maharashtra	S18	913	929	894	922	913	▲ (7)	▼ (−19)
24	Bihar	S19	908	918	935	919	942	▼ (−1)	▼ (−7)
25	Punjab	S20	904	895	846	876	798	▲ (19)	▲ (48)
26	Jharkhand	S21	899	948	948	941	965	▲ (7)	▼ (−17)
27	Telangana (Note: At the time of the census Telangana was a part of Andhra Pradesh. Telangana was declared as a separate state in 2014.)	S22	894	988	-	-	-	–	–
28	Odisha	S23	894	979	941	972	953	▲ (7)	▼ (−12)
29	Haryana	S24	893	879	834	861	819	▲ (18)	▲ (15)
30	Rajasthan	S25	891	928	888	921	909	▲ (7)	▼ (−21)
31	Tamil Nadu	S26	878	996	943	987	942	▲ (9)	▲ (1)
32	Himachal Pradesh	S27	875	972	909	968	896	▲ (4)	▲ (13)
33	Goa	S28	838	973	942	961	938	▲ (12)	▲ (4)
34	Chandigarh	UT6	838	818	880	777	845	▲ (41)	▲ (35)
35	Dadra and Nagar Haveli (Note: At the time of the census Dadra and Nagar Haveli and Daman and Diu were separate union territories. They became one union territories, Dadra and Nagar Haveli and Daman and Diu, in 2020.)	UT7	817	774	926	812	979	▼ (−38)	▼ (−53)
36	Daman and Diu	UT8	817	618	904	710	926	▼ (−92)	▼ (−22)

== See also ==
- Gender Development Index
- List of countries by sex ratio
- Human sex ratio
- Social Progress Index
- International rankings of India
- Women in India
- Female infanticide in India
- Female foeticide in India
