= Murder of Anu Bansal =

2016 murder in India

- Location: Bulandshahr, India
- Date: 14 June 2016
- Attack type: Burning
- Victim: Anu Bansal
- Perpetrator: Manoj Bansal
- Convictions: Murder
- Sentence: Life imprisonment

On 14 June 2016 Anu Bansal from Bulandshahr, India, received 80% burns to her body and died at Safdarjung Hospital, New Delhi, a few days later. In July 2022, her husband, Manoj Bansal, was found guilty of killing her for "not giving birth to a son". He received life imprisonment and a fine of Rs 20,000.

In 2016 a first information report (FIR) was filed under Section 302 (murder) of the Indian Penal Code (IPC), which the police later changed to 306 (suicide). The case was reopened two months later, following a letter written by Bansal's daughter Latika, to the then chief minister Akhilesh Yadav, who subsequently recruited senior officials to take on the case. In court, Bansal's daughters recounted their eyewitness account of their mother being burned, and told the court that their father was frequently abusive to their mother for the reason that she gave birth to daughters and not sons.

The story gained wide media coverage, including in The Times of India, the BBC News, The Tribune, and The Probe, which led its readers to The Lancet's' 2021 report that shows that 50% of the world's missing female births occur in India due to sex-selective abortion.

== Background ==
Anu Bansal was born to Omwati Devi of Bulandshahr, India. In 2000 she married Manoj Bansal of Sheetal Ganj, a village within Bulandshahr district. Latika and Tanya are their daughters.

== Incident and investigation ==
On 14 June 2016, Bansal received 80% burns to her body and died at Safdarjung Hospital, New Delhi on 20 June.

A first information report (FIR) was filed under Section 302 (murder) of the Indian Penal Code (IPC), which the police later changed to 306 (suicide). The case was reopened two months later, following a letter written by Latika to the then chief minister Akhilesh Yadav, who subsequently recruited senior officials to take on the case. The letter quoted Beti Bachao Beti Padhao and stated that their father and other members of his family burnt their mother, Anu Bansal, alive, and that subsequently the police deliberately changed the cause from "murder" to "suicide". The letter by the daughters received attention as it was written in Latika's own blood.

Lawyer Sanjay Sharma, represented the daughters, who recounted in court that their father was frequently abusive both psychologically and physically to their mother for the reason that she gave birth to daughters and not sons. The court was informed that she had been forced to terminate pregnancies after illegal sex determination tests showed that she was pregnant with a female fetus. (Note: Termination of pregnancies for the reason of the unborn baby being female increased in almost 75% of India’s districts between 2001 and 2011, and occurs within the background of a greater discrimination towards daughters than sons, as a result of a mixture of socioeconomic, cultural, and historical elements, despite that under the Pre-Conception and Pre-Natal Diagnostic Techniques Act, 1994 using prenatal diagnostic techniques for sex-selective abortions is illegal.) The girls stated in their testimony that "At 6:30am, we were woken up by the cries of our mother. We couldn't help her because the door of our room was locked from the outside. We watched her burn". According to Latika they called the local police and ambulance services but were "ignored". They then called their maternal uncle and grandmother who transferred her to a hospital.

== Verdict ==
In 2022 Manoj Bansal was found guilty of killing his wife Anu Bansal for "not giving birth to a son". He received life imprisonment and a fine of Rs 20,000. At the time of sentencing, he was 48 years old.

== Responses ==
The Times of India reported on the reopening of the case in 2016 and the verdict in 2022. The BBC News stated that Bulandshahr's court "agreed that Bansal was guilty of killing his wife" for want of a son, based on a belief "rooted in a widely-held cultural belief that a male child would carry forward the family legacy and look after the parents in their old age, while daughters would cost them dowries and leave them for their matrimonial homes." In response to the verdict The Tribune stated that it questioned the cultural preference for sons. The Probe concluded their report on the murder that "like Anu Bansal, numerous women are forced to abort their baby girls and are assaulted or killed when they raise their voices in abusive marriages. The dark tales of India's aborted daughters and missing females should be a wake-up call to our government." It used the story to direct their readers to The Lancet's report that shows that due to sex-selective abortion India accounts for 50% of the world's missing female births.
