= Female foeticide in India =

Illegal abortion of females in India

Female foeticide in India is the abortion of a female foetus outside of legal methods. Research by Pew Research Center based on Union government data indicates foeticide of at least 9 million females in the years 2000–2019. The research found that 86.7% of these foeticides were by Hindus (80% of the population), followed by Muslims (14% of the population) with 6.6%. The research also indicated an overall decline in preference for sons or daughter in the time period.

The natural sex ratio is assumed to be between 103 and 107 males per 100 females, and any number above it is considered suggestive of female foeticide. According to the decennial Indian census, the sex ratio in 0 to 6 age group in India has risen from 102.4 males per 100 females in 1961, to 104.2 in 1980, to 107.5 in 2001, to 108.9 in 2011.

The child sex ratio is within the normal range in all eastern and southern states of India, but significantly higher in certain western and particularly northwestern states such as Maharashtra, Haryana, Jammu and Kashmir (118, 120 and 116, as of 2011, respectively). The child sex ratio noted in the western states of Maharashtra and Rajasthan in the 2011 census was 113, in Gujarat 112 and Uttar Pradesh 111. The higher ratios in Maharashtra and Gujrat can also be attributed to an influx of male migration into the region.

The Indian census data indicates that the sex ratio is poor when women have one or two children, but gets better as they have more children, which is result of sex-selective "stopping practices" (stopping having children based on sex of those born). The Indian census data also suggests there is a positive correlation between abnormal sex ratio and better socio-economic status and literacy. This may be connected to the dowry system in India where dowry deaths occur when a girl is seen as a financial burden. Urban India has higher child sex ratio than rural India according to 1991, 2001 and 2011 Census data, implying higher prevalence of female foeticide in urban India. Similarly, child sex ratio greater than 115 boys per 100 girls is found in regions where the predominant majority is Hindu; furthermore "normal" child sex ratio of 104 to 106 boys per 100 girls are found in regions where the predominant majority is Muslim, Sikh or Christian. These data suggest that sex selection is a practice which takes place among some educated, rich sections or a particular religion of the Indian society.

There is an ongoing debate as to whether these high sex ratios are only caused by female foeticide or some of the higher ratio is explained by natural causes. The Indian government has passed Pre-Conception and Pre-Natal Diagnostic Techniques Act (PCPNDT) in 1994 to ban and punish prenatal sex ratio screening and female foeticide. It is currently illegal in India to determine or disclose sex of the foetus to anyone. However, there are concerns that PCPNDT Act has been poorly enforced by authorities.

== High sex ratio implication ==
One school of scholars suggest that any birth sex ratio of boys to girls that is outside of the normal 105–107 range, necessarily implies sex-selective abortion. These scholars claim that both the sex ratio at birth and the population sex ratio are remarkably constant in human populations. Significant deviations in birth sex ratios from the normal range can only be explained by manipulation, that is sex-selective abortion. In a widely cited article, Amartya Sen compared the birth sex ratio in Europe (106) and United States (105+) with those in Asia (107+) and argued that the high sex ratios in East Asia, West Asia and South Asia may be due to excessive female mortality. Sen pointed to research that had shown that if men and women receive similar nutritional and medical attention and good health care then females have better survival rates, and it is the male which is the genetically fragile sex. Sen estimated 'missing women' from extra women who would have survived in Asia if it had the same ratio of women to men as Europe and United States. According to Sen, the high birth sex ratio over decades, implies a female shortfall of 11% in Asia, or over 100 million women as missing from the 3 billion combined population of India, other South Asian countries, West Asia, North Africa and China.

== Origin ==
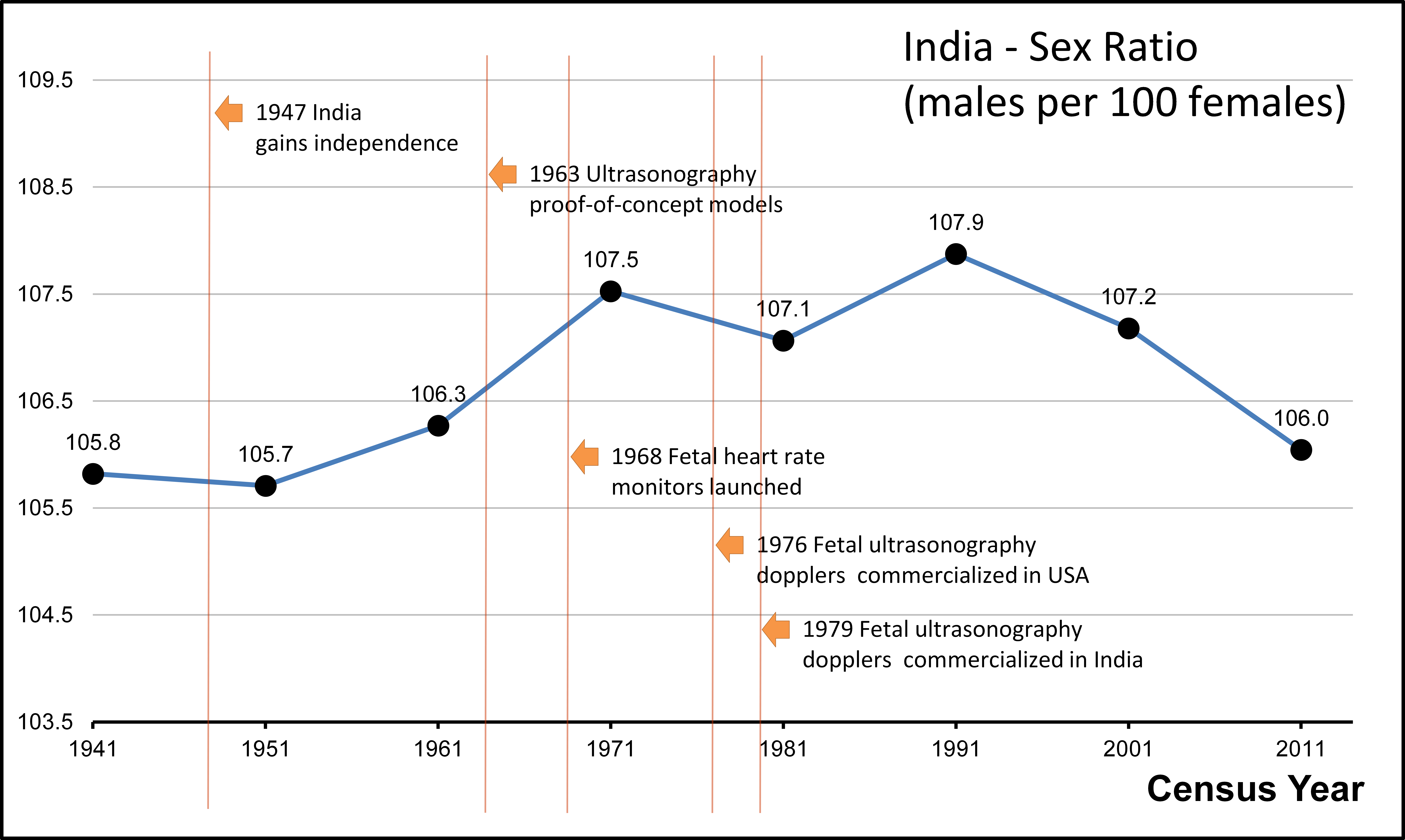
Male to female sex ratio for India, based on its official census data, from 1941 through 2011. The data suggests the existence of high sex ratios before and after the arrival of ultrasound-based prenatal care and sex screening technologies in India.

Female foeticide has been linked to the arrival, in the early 1990s, of affordable ultrasound technology and its widespread adoption in India. Obstetric ultrasonography, either transvaginally or transabdominally, checks for various markers of fetal sex. It can be performed at or after week 12 of pregnancy. At this point, 3/4 of fetal sexes can be correctly determined, according to a 2001 study. Accuracy for males is approximately 50% and for females almost 100%. When performed after week 13 of pregnancy, ultrasonography gives an accurate result in almost 100% of cases.

Availability

Ultrasound technology arrived in China and India in 1979, but its expansion was slower in India. Ultrasound sex discernment technologies were first introduced in major cities of India in 1980s, its use expanded in India's urban regions in 1990s, and became widespread in 2000s.

=== Magnitude estimates for female foeticide ===
Estimates for female foeticide vary by scholar. One group estimates more than 10 million female fetuses may have been illegally aborted in India since 1990s, and 500,000 girls were being lost annually due to female foeticide. MacPherson estimates that 100,000 abortions every year continue to be performed in India solely because the fetus is female.

== Reasons for female foeticide ==
Various theories have been proposed as possible reasons for sex-selective abortion. Culture is favored by some researchers, while some favor disparate gender-biased access to resources. Some demographers question whether sex-selective abortion or infanticide claims are accurate, because underreporting of female births may also explain high sex ratios. Natural reasons may also explain some of the abnormal sex ratios. Klasen and Wink suggest India and China's high sex ratios are primarily the result of sex-selective abortion.

=== Cultural preference ===
One school of scholars suggested that female foeticide can be seen through history and cultural background. Generally, male babies were preferred because they provided manual labor and success the family lineage. The selective abortion of female fetuses is most common in areas where cultural norms value male children over female children for a variety of social and economic reasons. A son is often preferred as an "asset" since he can earn and support the family; a daughter is a "liability" since she will be married off to another family, and so will not contribute financially to her parents. Female foeticide then, is a continuation in a different form, of a practice of female infanticide or withholding of postnatal health care for girls in certain households. Furthermore, in some cultures sons are expected to take care of their parents in their old age. These factors are complicated by the effect of diseases on child sex ratio, where communicable and noncommunicable diseases affect males and females differently.

=== Disparate gendered access to resource ===
Some of the variation in birth sex ratios and implied female foeticide may be due to disparate access to resources. As MacPherson (2007) notes, there can be significant differences in gender violence and access to food, healthcare, immunizations between male and female children. This leads to high infant and childhood mortality among girls, which causes changes in sex ratio.

Disparate, gendered access to resources appears to be strongly linked to socioeconomic status. Specifically, poorer families are sometimes forced to ration food, with daughters typically receiving less priority than sons (Klasen and Wink 2003). However, Klasen's 2001 study revealed that this practice is less common in the poorest families, but rises dramatically in the slightly less poor families. Klasen and Wink's 2003 study suggests that this is “related to greater female economic independence and fewer cultural strictures among the poorest sections of the population.” In other words, the poorest families are typically less bound by cultural expectations and norms, and women tend to have more freedom to become family breadwinners out of necessity.

Lopez and Ruzikah (1983) found that, when given the same resources, women tend to outlive men at all stages of life after infancy. However, globally, resources are not always allocated equitably. Disparities in access to healthcare, education, and nutrition are considered contributing factors to skewed sex ratios in certain regions.

==== Public goods provisions by female leaders (majority vs. minority spillover goods) ====
Minority goods provided by female leaders in India help to alleviate some of the problems of disparate gendered access to resources for women. Public goods are defined as non-excludable and non-rival, but India lacks a system of public goods and has many problems with access to clean water or roads. Additionally, many of the "public goods" exclude females because families choose to prioritize their male children's access to those resources. In India, previous research has found that women leaders invest in public goods that are more in line with female preferences, in particular water infrastructure, which leads to a reduction in time spent on domestic chores by adolescent girls. This in turn results in more time for young girls to gain an education and increases their value to their families and to society so that they are more likely to give them access to resources in the future. Minority groups, like women, are likely to provide minority or low spillover goods such as transfers, rations, and water connections, which only benefit other women. The majority of men do not find any benefit from these goods and are less likely to invest in them. For example, in a study conducted by political scientists Chattopadhyay and Duflo, results show that in West Bengal women complain more about water and roads and the women politicians invest more in those issues. In Rajasthan, where women complain more often about drinking water, women politicians invest more in water and less in roads.

=== Dowry system ===
Even though the dowry system legally ended with the Dowry Prohibition Act of 1961, the impossibility of monitoring families and the prevalence of corruption have led to its continuance all over India. A dowry is a payment from the bride's family to the groom's family at the time of marriage. It is often found in "socially stratified, monogamous societies that are economically complex and where women have a relatively small productive role". Theoretically, marriage results in partners choosing the mate who best maximizes their utility and there is equal distribution of returns to both participants. The outcome is pareto optimal and reaches equilibrium when no one can be better off with any other partner or choosing not to marry. However, if both partners do not share an equal distribution of the returns then there must be a transfer of funds between them in order to reach efficiency. In Indian society, the rise of economic growth has allowed men to work in "productive" jobs and gain an income, but many women are not afforded these opportunities. Therefore, women and their families have to compete for men and pay a dowry as a transaction payment to make up for the lack of productive inputs they bring into a marriage. Dowries have been rising in India for the last six decades and increased 15 percent annually between 1921 and 1981. Women are valued less in this partnership and therefore are asked to pay in order to gain the benefits a man brings. The power hierarchy and financial obligation created through this system help perpetuate acts like female foeticide and a high son preference. Additionally, the technological progress leading to sex selective abortions lowers the cost of discrimination and many people think that it is better to pay a "500 rupees now (abortion) instead of 50,000 rupees in the future (dowry)."

Furthermore, dowry-related expenses also extend well beyond marriage. The bride's family is expected to bear the burden of high expenses for the groom.

=== India's weak social security system ===
Another reason for this male preference is based on the economic benefits of having a son and the costs of having a daughter. In India, there is a very limited social security system so parents look to their sons to ensure their futures and care for them in old age. Daughters are liabilities because they have to leave to another family once they are married and cannot take care of their parents. Additionally, they do not contribute economically to the family wealth and are costly because of the dowry system. People in India usually see men's work as "productive" and contributing the family, while the social perception of female labor does not have that connotation. This also ties to the fact that it is easier for men in India to get high paying jobs and provide financially for their families. Women need increased access to education and economic resources in order to reach that level of gainful employment and change people's perceptions of daughters being financial liabilities. With this cost and benefit analysis, many families come to the conclusion that they must prioritize male children's lives over female lives in order to ensure their financial future.

The traditional social security system in India is family centered, with the joint family of three generations living together and taking care of each other.

== Consequences of a declining sex ratio in Indian states ==
2011 Census sex ratio map for the states and Union Territories of India, boys per 100 girls in 0 to 1 age group

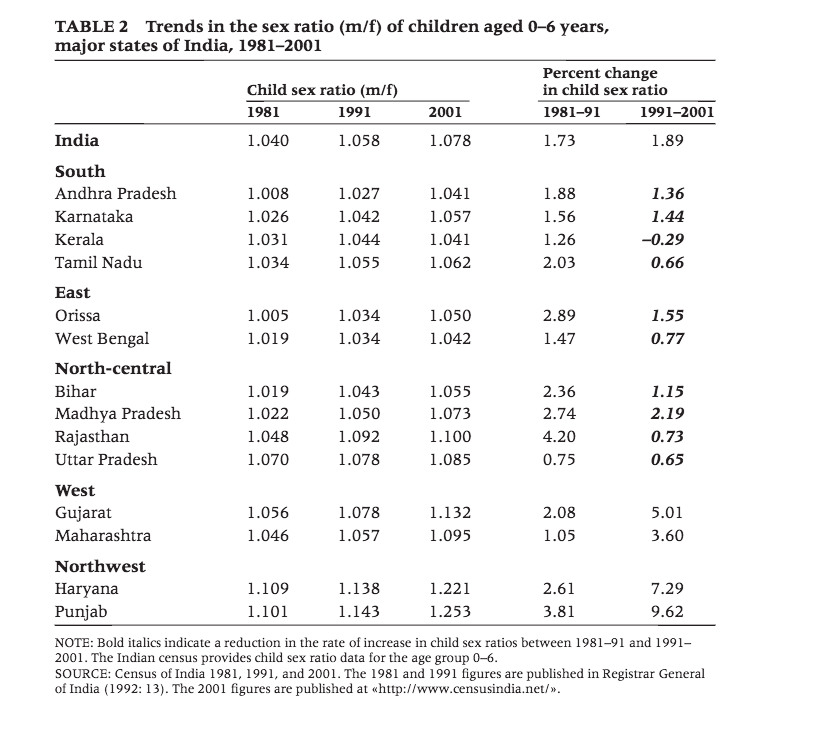
This table gives information on the child sex ratio in major states in India throughout the years 1981, 1991, and 2001.

The following table presents the child sex ratio data for India's states and union territories, according to 2011 Census of India for population count in the 0–1 age group. The data suggests 18 states/UT had birth sex ratio higher than 107 implying excess males at birth and/or excess female mortalities after birth but before she reaches the age of 1, 13 states/UT had normal child sex ratios in the 0–1 age group, and 4 states/UT had birth sex ratio less than 103 implying excess females at birth and/or excess male mortalities after birth but before he reaches the age of 1.

State / UT	Boys (0–1 age) 2011 Census	Girls (0–1 age) 2011 Census	Sex ratio (Boys per 100 girls)
India	10,633,298	9,677,936	109.9
Jammu and Kashmir	154,761	120,551	128.4
Haryana	254,326	212,408	119.7
Punjab	226,929	193,021	117.6
Uttarakhand	92,117	80,649	114.2
Delhi	135,801	118,896	114.2
Maharashtra	946,095	829,465	114.1
Lakashadweep	593	522	114.0
Rajasthan	722,108	635,198	113.7
Gujarat	510,124	450,743	113.2
Uttar Pradesh	1,844,947	1,655,612	111.4
Chandigarh	8,283	7,449	111.2
Daman and Diu	1,675	1,508	111.1
Bihar	1,057,050	957,907	110.3
Himchal Pradesh	53,261	48,574	109.6
Madhya Pradesh	733,148	677,139	108.3
Goa	9,868	9,171	107.6
Jharkhand	323,923	301,266	107.5
Manipur	22,852	21,326	107.2
Andhra Pradesh	626,538	588,309	106.5
Tamil Nadu	518,251	486,720	106.5
Odisha	345,960	324,949	106.5
Dadra and Nagar Haveli	3,181	3,013	105.6
Karnataka	478,346	455,299	105.1
West Bengal	658,033	624,760	105.0
Assam	280,888	267,962	104.8
Nagaland	17,103	16,361	104.5
Sikkim	3,905	3,744	104.3
Chhattisgarh	253,745	244,497	103.8
Tripura	28,650	27,625	103.7
Meghalaya	41,353	39,940	103.5
Arunachal Pradesh	11,799	11,430	103.2
Andaman and Nicobar Islands	2,727	2,651	102.9
Kerala	243,852	238,489	102.2
Puducherry	9,089	8,900	102.1
Mizoram	12,017	11,882	101.1

=== Marriage market and importation of brides ===
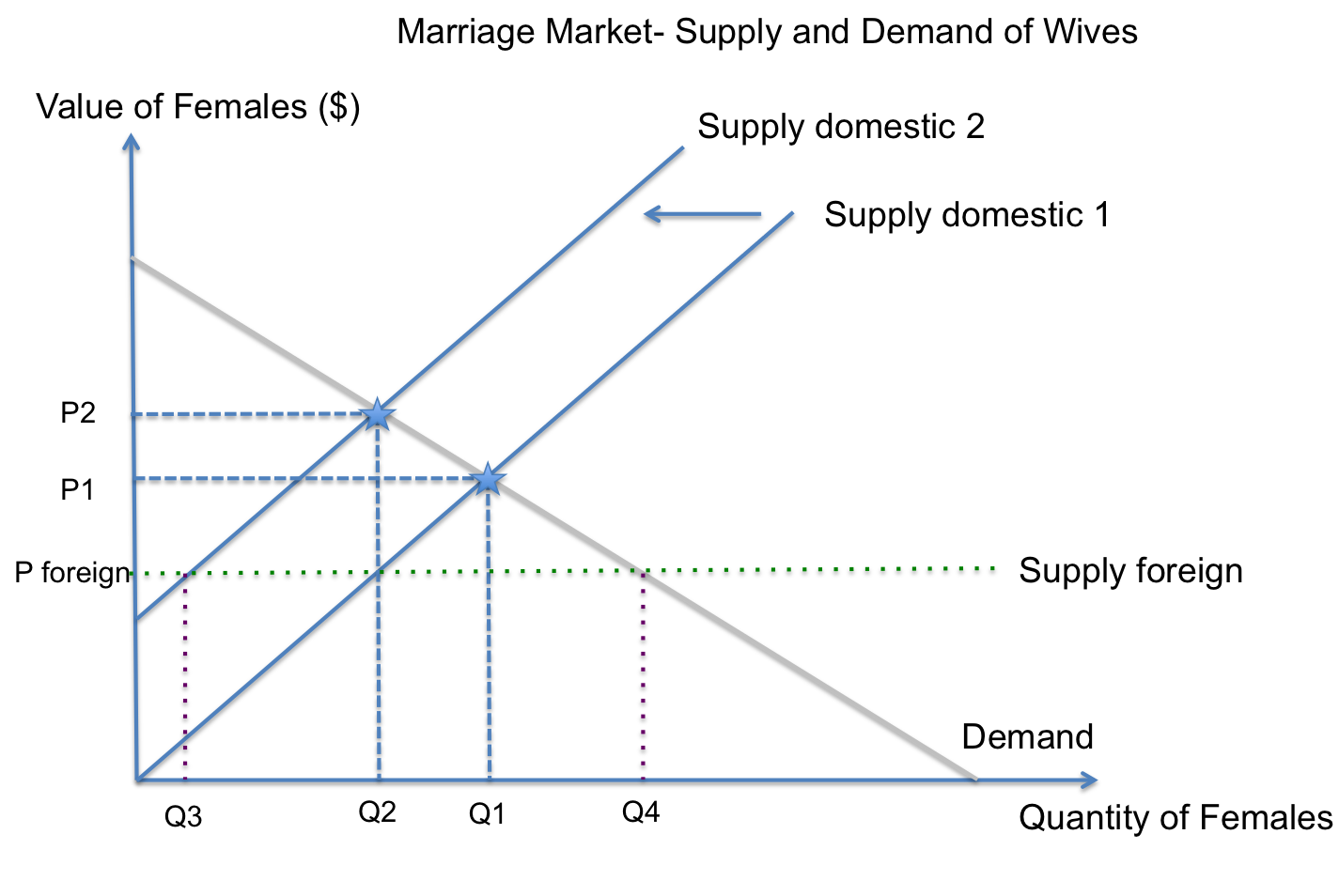
This graph shows the marriage market for women in India and how the lack of females due to female foeticide results in a lower supply of women. The gap is bridged by men kidnapping or importing wives from other regions.

Classic economic theory views the market for marriage as one in which people bargain for a spouse who maximizes their utility gains from marriage. In India, many of these bargains actually take place within the family and therefore individual utility is replaced by family utility. In this marriage market, men and their families are trying to maximize their utility, which creates a supply and demand for wives. However, female foeticide and a high sex ratio have high implications for this market. Dharma Kumar, argues that, "Sex selection at conception will reduce the supply of women, they will become more valuable, and female children will be better cared for and will live longer". In the graph, this is depicted by the leftward shift of the supply curve and the subsequent decrease in quantity of females from Q1 to Q2 and increase in their value from P1 to P2. However, this model does not work for the situation in India because it does not account for the common act of males importing brides from other regions. A low supply of women results in men and their families trafficking women from other areas and leads to increased sexual violence and abuse against women and children, increased child marriages, and increased maternal deaths due to forced abortions and early marriages. This ends up devaluing women instead of the presumed effect of increasing their value.

In the graph, the supply of brides outside each village, locality, or region is depicted as 'supply foreign'. This foreign supply values the price of getting a wife at much cheaper than the first domestic price P1 and the second domestic price P2. Therefore, due to the decrease of women domestically due to sex selection and the low price of foreign women (because they are often bought as slaves or kidnapped), the resulting gap of imported women is from Q3 to Q4. Women act like imports in an international trade market if the import price is lower than the high price of domestic dowries with a low supply of women. The foreign price is lower than the market price and this results in even fewer domestic brides than without importation (Q3 instead of Q2). In turn, this creates a self-fulfilling cycle of limiting females domestically and continually importing them and there is no end to the cycle of female feticide if these acts can continue and importation is an option.

The imported brides are known as "paros" and are treated very badly because they have no cultural, regional, or familial ties to their husbands before being brought into their homes. One of the field studies in Haryana revealed that more than 9000 married women are bought from other Indian states as imported brides. This act also results in wife sharing and polyandry by family members in some areas of Haryana, Rajasthan, and Punjab, which maintains the gender imbalance if one family can make do with only one female. For example, the polyandrous Toda of Nilgiri Hills in southern India practiced female infanticide in order to maintain a certain demographic imbalance.

=== Negative spillovers of prenatal sex selection and female foeticide ===
When families choose to partake in prenatal sex selection through illegal ultrasounds or abortions, they impart a negative spillover on society. These include increased gender disparity, a high sex ratio, lives lost, lack of development, and abuse and violence against women and children. Families do not often keep this spillover in mind and this results in sex selection and female foeticide, which hurts society as a whole.

=== Empirical study on male/female child mortality ===
A study by Satish B. Agnihotri infers the gender bias in India by studying the relationship between male and female infant and child mortality rates in the face of mortality as a whole looking like it is decreasing. Hypothetically, if males and females are identical, then there should be no difference in mortality rates and no gender gap. However, male and female children are perceived as psychologically and socially different so the equation relating mortality looks like this: MRf = a + b*MRm. MRf is female child mortality, a is residual female mortality when male mortality is 0, the slope b shows the rate of decline in female mortality for a decline in male mortality, and MRm is male mortality. In India, the infant mortality equation for 1982–1997 was IMRf = 6.5 + 0.93* IMRm, which shows that there is a high level of residual female mortality and male mortality declines slightly faster than female mortality. The author then breaks down the information by states and rural or urban population. Many states, like Haryana, that are known for high levels of female mortality have slopes greater than 1, which seems counterintuitive. However, this actually goes to show that prenatal selection may reduce the extent of infanticide or poor treatment of girls who are born. It has a substitution effect on the post-natal discrimination and replaces its effects instead of adding to it. Additionally, urban households usually have a high constant term and a low slope. This shows that simply reducing mortality may not result in a subsequent reduction of female mortality. This research goes to show the extent of gender discrimination in India and how this affects the high sex ratio. It is important to not only target mortality, but specifically female mortality if there is to be any change in gender disparities.

== Laws and regulations ==
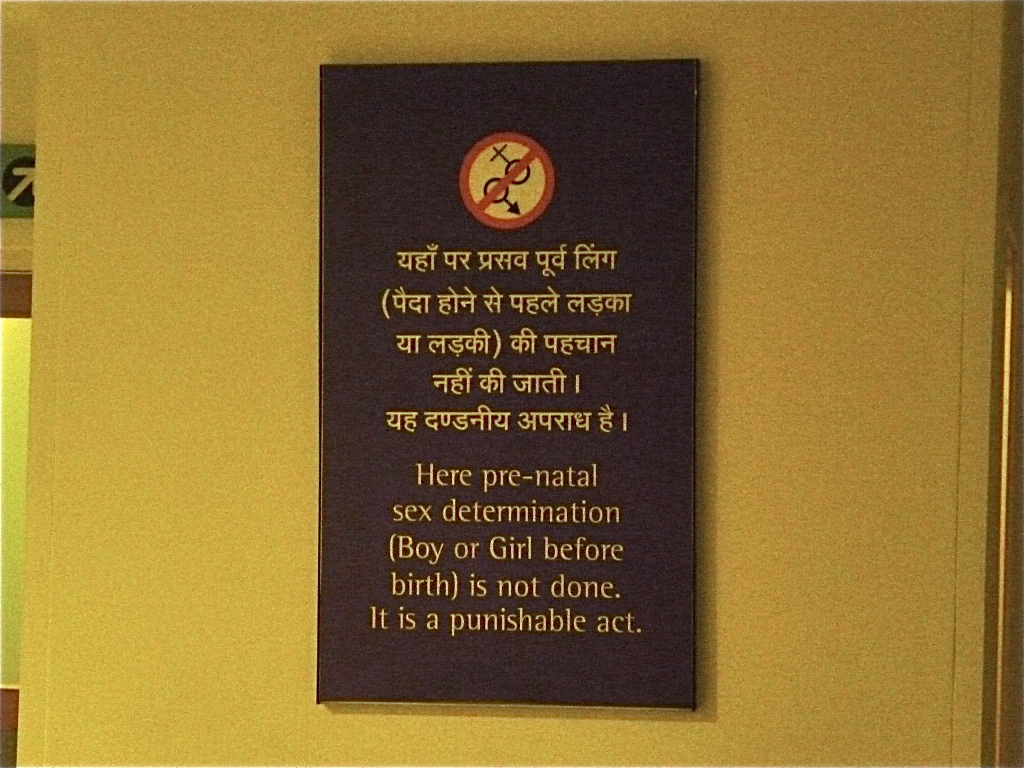
A sign in an Indian hospital stating that prenatal sex determination is a crime.

India passed its first abortion-related law, the so-called Medical Termination of Pregnancy Act of 1971, making abortion legal in most states, but specified legally acceptable reasons for abortion such as medical risk to mother and rape. The law also established physicians who can legally provide the procedure and the facilities where abortions can be performed, but did not anticipate female foeticide based on technology advances. With increasing availability of sex screening technologies in India through the 1980s in urban India, and claims of its misuse, the Government of India passed the Pre-natal Diagnostic Techniques Act (PNDT) in 1994. This law was further amended into the Pre-Conception and Pre-natal Diagnostic Techniques (Regulation and Prevention of Misuse) (PCPNDT) Act in 2004 to deter and punish prenatal sex screening and female foeticide. However, there are concerns that PCPNDT Act has been poorly enforced by authorities.

The impact of Indian laws on female foeticide and its enforcement is unclear. United Nations Population Fund and India's National Human Rights Commission, in 2009, asked the Government of India to assess the impact of the law. The Public Health Foundation of India, a premier research organization in its 2010 report, claimed a lack of awareness about the Act in parts of India, inactive role of the Appropriate Authorities, ambiguity among some clinics that offer prenatal care services, and the role of a few medical practitioners in disregarding the law. The Ministry of Health and Family Welfare of India has targeted education and media advertisements to reach clinics and medical professionals to increase awareness. The Indian Medical Association has undertaken efforts to prevent prenatal sex selection by giving its members Beti Bachao (save the daughter) badges during its meetings and conferences. However, a recent study by Nandi and Deolalikar (2013) argues that the 1994 PNDT Act may have had a small impact by preventing 106,000 female foeticides over one decade.

According to a 2007 study by MacPherson, prenatal Diagnostic Techniques Act (PCPNDT Act) was highly publicized by NGOs and the government. Many of the ads used depicted abortion as violent, creating fear of abortion itself within the population. The ads focused on the religious and moral shame associated with abortion. MacPherson claims this media campaign was not effective because some perceived this as an attack on their character, leading to many becoming closed off, rather than opening a dialogue about the issue. This emphasis on morality, claims MacPherson, increased fear and shame associated with all abortions, leading to an increase in unsafe abortions in India.

The government of India, in a 2011 report, has begun better educating all stakeholders about its MTP and PCPNDT laws. In its communication campaigns, it is clearing up public misconceptions by emphasizing that sex determination is illegal, but abortion is legal for certain medical conditions in India. The government is also supporting implementation of programs and initiatives that seek to reduce gender discrimination, including media campaign to address the underlying social causes of sex selection.

Given the dismal Child Sex Ratio in the country, and the Supreme Court directive of 2003 to State governments to enforce the law banning the use of sex determination technologies, the Ministry set up a National Inspection and Monitoring Committee (NIMC). Dr. Rattan Chand, Director (PNDT) was made the convenor of the NIMC. The NIMC under the guidance of Dr. Rattan Chand conducted raids in some of the districts in Maharashtra, Punjab, Haryana, Himachal Pradesh, Delhi and Gujarat. In April, it conducted raids on three clinics in Delhi. In its reports sent to the Chief Secretaries of the respective States, the committee observed that the Authorities had failed to monitor or supervise the registered clinics.

=== Laws passed in India to alleviate female foeticide ===
Other Legislation	Year Passed	Goals
Dowry Prohibition Act	1961	Prohibits families from taking a dowry, punishable with imprisonment
Hindu Marriage Act	1955	Rules around marriage and divorce for Hindus
Hindu Adoption and Maintenance Act	1956	Deals with the legal process of adopting children and the legal obligation to provide "maintenance" for other family members
Immoral Traffic Prevention Act	1986	Stops sex trafficking and exploitation
Equal Remuneration Act	1976	Prevents monetary discrimination between men and women in the workforce
Female Infanticide Act	1870	Prevents female infanticide (Act passed in British India)
Ban on ultrasound testing	1996	Bans prenatal sex determination

=== Central and state government schemes to alleviate female foeticide and child mortality ===
Other recent policy initiatives adopted by many states of India, claims Guilmoto, attempt to address the assumed economic disadvantage of girls by offering support to girls and their parents. These policies provide conditional cash transfer and scholarships only available to girls, where payments to a girl and her parents are linked to each stage of her life, such as when she is born, completion of her childhood immunization, her joining school at grade 1, her completing school grades 6, 9 and 12, her marriage past age 21. Some states are offering higher pension benefits to parents who raise one or two girls. Different states of India have been experimenting with various innovations in their girl-driven welfare policies. For example, the state of Delhi adopted a pro-girl policy initiative (locally called Laadli scheme), which initial data suggests may be lowering the birth sex ratio in the state. These types of government programs and schemes are a type of redistribution in an attempt to further development in the country. The central and state governments in India have noticed the country's failure to deal with female foeticide on its own and have come up with programs to deal with the problem at hand.

A serious flaw that makes all of these programs ineffective is that they target only lower-income households, while ignoring the population of higher-income households also partaking in female foeticide. Sex determination tests and sex selective abortions are prevalent more amongst affluent families. For example, upper-class families in Haryana have high rates of foeticide and infanticide and the programs do not target these families. A study in Haryana found that the sex ratio at birth for upper caste women was 127 males for 100 females, compared with 105 with lower caste women. While cash transfers successfully improve school enrollment and immunization rates for girls, they do not directly address parent's demand for sons and gender-biased sex selection. Additionally, a study conducted by Bijayalaxmi Nanda, an associate professor of political science at Delhi University, found that many of the beneficiaries of the Delhi Ladli Scheme wanted to use the money received for marriage rather than educational expenses. Another problem with these government conditional cash transfers is that many of them only target the first two daughters in a family and have no incentive for families to have more than two daughters. These non-linear incentive models do not result in the same increase in benefits as the inputs and cash transfers put in by the government. Additionally, they only incentivize a change in behavior until an age, educational, number of daughters threshold and do not prompt people to act beyond these guidelines.

==== Select Schemes by the Central and State Governments ====
Program	Year Passed	Central or State Government	Benefits
Balika Samriddhi Yojana	1997	Central Government	Cash transfer to mother based on child meeting educational conditions and partaking in income generating activities
Dhan Laxmi Scheme	2008	Central Government	Cash transfers to family after meeting conditions (immunization, education, insurance)
Kanya Jagriti Jyoti Scheme	1996	Punjab	Cash transfers to two girl children in a family after meeting conditions (immunization, education, insurance)
Beti Bachao, Beti Padhao Yojana	2015	Central Government	Cash transfers based on educational attainment
National Plan of Action	1992	Central Government	For the survival, protection, and development of girl children. Goals include ending female feticide, reducing gender disparity, and giving girls better access to resources
Cradle Baby Scheme	1992	Tamil Nadu	To eradicate female infanticide and to save the girl children from the clutches of death
Devirupak	2002	Haryana	Cash transfer to couple accepting terminal method of family planning (vasectomy, tubectomy) after birth of 1st or 2nd child
Delhi Ladli Scheme	2008	Delhi	Cash transfer based on educational attainment for first two daughters
Apni Beti Apna Dhan	1994	Haryana	Cash transfer if daughter reaches the age of 18 without being married
Girl Child Protection Scheme	2005	Andhra Pradesh	Cash transfer based on age and educational attainment. Family also has to partake in family planning
Beti Hai Anmol Scheme	2010	Himachal Pradesh	Interest earned on back account in daughter's name and cash scholarships for each year of school
Bhagya Laxmi Scheme	2007	Karnataka	Cash transfer based on age and educational attainment. Cash provided to families for natural death, health insurance, and scholarships
Mukhyamantri Kanya Suraksha Yojna and Mukhyamantri Kanya Vivah Yojna	2008	Bihar	Cash transfers to poor families with two daughters
Indra Gandhi Balika Suraksha Yojana	2007	Himachal Pradesh	Cash transfers based on age attainment
Ladli Laxami Yojna	2006	Madhya Pradesh, Jharkhand	Cash transfers based on educational attainment
Rakshak Yojana	2005	Punjab	Cash monthly transfers for families with two girls
Mukhyamantri Kanyadan Yojna	2017	Madhya Pradesh	Cash transfer for marriage assistance if the family waits until the legal age to marry off their daughter
Sukanya Samriddhi Account	2015	Central Government	Interest earned on bank account opened for daughter after she turns 21

== Movie based on female foeticide in India ==
In August 2023 a movie Titled ‘Panch Kriti’ - Five Elements based on Swachh Bharat Mission was released in India which featured five stories and is set in Chanderi in Bundelkhand, Madhya Pradesh, has been largely shot in real locations. It was a women-centric film that touches upon several important themes and topics pertaining to women. It also delves into the importance of social movements taking place in India like ‘Swachh Bharat Abhiyaan’ and ‘Beti Bachao Beti Padhaao Abhiyaan’.

== Other campaigns ==
Increasing awareness of the problem has led to multiple campaigns by celebrities and journalists to combat sex-selective abortions. Aamir Khan devoted the first episode "Daughters Are Precious" of his show Satyamev Jayate to raise awareness of this widespread practice, focusing primarily on Western Rajasthan, which is known to be one of the areas where this practice is common. Its sex ratio dropped to 883 girls per 1,000 boys in 2011 from 901 girls to 1000 boys in 2001. Rapid response was shown by local government in Rajasthan after the airing of this show, showing the effect of media and nationwide awareness on the issue. A vow was made by officials to set up fast-track courts to punish those who practice sex-based abortion. They cancelled the licences of six sonography centres and issued notices to over 20 others.

This has been done on the smaller scale. Cultural intervention has been addressed through theatre. Plays such as 'Pacha Mannu', which is about female infanticide/foeticide, has been produced by a women's theatre group in Tamil Nadu. This play was showing mostly in communities that practice female infanticide/foeticide and has led to a redefinition of a methodology of consciousness raising, opening up varied ways of understanding and subverting cultural expressions.

The Mumbai High Court ruled that prenatal sex determination implied female foeticide. Sex determination violated a woman's right to live and was against India's Constitution.

The Beti Bachao, or Save girls campaign, has been underway in many Indian communities since the early 2000s. The campaign uses the media to raise awareness of the gender disparities creating, and resulting from, sex-selective abortion. Beti Bachao activities include rallies, posters, short videos and television commercials, some of which are sponsored by state and local governments and other organisations. Many celebrities in India have publicly supported the Beti Bachao campaign.

== See also ==
India specific

- Domestic violence in India
- Dowry system in India
- Feminism in India
- Gender inequality in India
- Men's rights movement in India
- National Commission for Women
- Rape in India
- Sexism in India
- Welfare schemes for women in India
- Women in agriculture in India
- Women in India
- Women's Reservation Bill
- Women's suffrage in India

Other related

- Bride burning
- Foeticide
- Gendercide
- Sex selection
- Prenatal sex discernment
- Bride buying
- Intra-household bargaining
