= Payments as a service =

Payments as a service (PaaS) is a marketing phrase used to describe software as a service to connect a group of international payment systems. The architecture is represented by a layer – or overlay – that resides on top of these disparate systems and provides for two-way communications between the payment system and the PaaS. Communication is governed by standard APIs created by the PaaS provider.

== History ==
Payment as a platform diagram

Since the 1980s, credit cards and international wire transfer systems like the Society for Worldwide Interbank Financial Telecommunication (SWIFT) have been primary methods for making and receiving electronic cross-border payments. Within individual countries, payers and payees have used various electronic systems to make such payments. In the United States, for instance, the Federal Reserve Bank operates the automated clearing house (ACH) system.

In the Eurozone the Single Euro Payments Area (SEPA) defines the rules for credit transfer (SCT) and direct debits (SDD) for Euro payments and these are implemented by various clearing and settlement both within Eurozone countries and for pan-European payments. SEPA Instant (SCT Inst) has been available since November 2017 for single immediate payments. The ECB provides a real time gross settlement system (RTGS) for SEPA payments called TARGET2. The ECB also provides TIPS for immediate settlement of SEPA payments using TARGET2. RT1 from EBA Clearing provides a pan-European ACH (PEACH) for SEPA instant payments settling on TARGET2.

With the advent of the World Wide Web, it became necessary to provide alternative payment systems. At first, consumers were hesitant to use their credit cards on the Web due to security concerns. Entrepreneurs tried to market an "electronic wallet". As early as 1994, CyberCash allowed consumers to make secure purchases over the Internet.

CyberCash eventually failed. In March 2000, PayPal was formed and became a predominant electronic wallet in the U.S. Similar regional services include WebMoney and Yandex.Money in Russia and Alipay in China. While popular in their own countries, these do not have significant global reach. PayPal and Moneybookers (Skrill) became regional electronic wallets, providing greater liquidity, but still do not provide for the free flow of funds between all popular electronic wallet solutions.

== See also ==
- as a service
- Electronic billing
- Electronic funds transfer
- Payment service provider
- Transaction payments as a service
