= Prenatal sex discernment =

Prenatal testing for discerning the sex of a fetus before birth

Prenatal sex discernment is the prenatal testing for discerning the sex of a fetus before birth.

== Methods ==
Prenatal sex discernment can be performed by preimplantation genetic diagnosis before conception, but this method may not always be classified as prenatal sex discernment because it is performed even before implantation.

- Cell-free fetal DNA testing, wherein a venipuncture is performed on the mother to analyze the small amount of fetal DNA that can be found within it. It provides the earliest post-implantation test. A meta-analysis published in 2011 found that such tests are reliable more than 98% of the time, as long as they are taken after the seventh week of pregnancy.
- Chorionic villus sampling (CVS) and amniocentesis are two rather invasive testing procedures. These may, in principle, be performed as early as the 8th and the 9th week of pregnancy. The difficulty of these tests and the risk of injury to the foetus, potentially resulting in miscarriage or congenital abnormalities (especially when done early during the pregnancy), make them quite rare during the first trimester. In the United States, CVS and amniocentesis are most commonly performed after the 11th and the 15th week of pregnancy.
- Obstetric ultrasonography, either transvaginally or transabdominally, can check for the sagittal sign as a marker of foetal sex. It can be performed as early as 65 and 69 days from fertilization (week 12 of gestational age), where it gives a result in 90% of cases – a result that is correct in approximately 3/4 of cases, according to a study from 2001. Accuracy for males is approximately 50% and for females almost 100%. When performed later, after 70 days from fertilization (at week 13 of gestational age), it gives an accurate result in almost 100% of cases.

== Applications ==
Potential applications of prenatal sex discernment include:

- Disease testing: A complement to specific gene testing for monogenic disorders, which can be very useful for genetic diseases with sex linkage, such as, for example, X-linked diseases. In such cases, it may be much easier to exclude the possibility of disease in the child by prenatal sex discernment than to test for any specific sign of the disease itself. Common X-linked recessive disorders include Duchenne muscular dystrophy, fragile X syndrome and haemophilia.
- Preparation, for any sex-dependent aspects of parenting.
- Sex selection, which after preimplantation genetic diagnosis may be performed by selecting only embryos of the preferred sex, or, after post-implantation methods by performing sex-selective abortion depending on the test result and personal preference. A 2006 survey found that 42 per cent of IVF clinics in the US that offer PGD have provided it for sex selection for non-medical reasons. Nearly half of these clinics perform it only for "family balancing", which is where a couple with two or more children of one sex desire a child of the other, but half do not restrict sex selection to family balancing. In India, this practice has been used to select for male embryos, although this practice is illegal. Opinions on whether sex selection for non-medical reasons is ethically acceptable differ widely, as exemplified by the fact that the European Society of Human Reproduction and Embryology Task Force could not formulate a uniform recommendation.

== Legal status ==
=== India ===
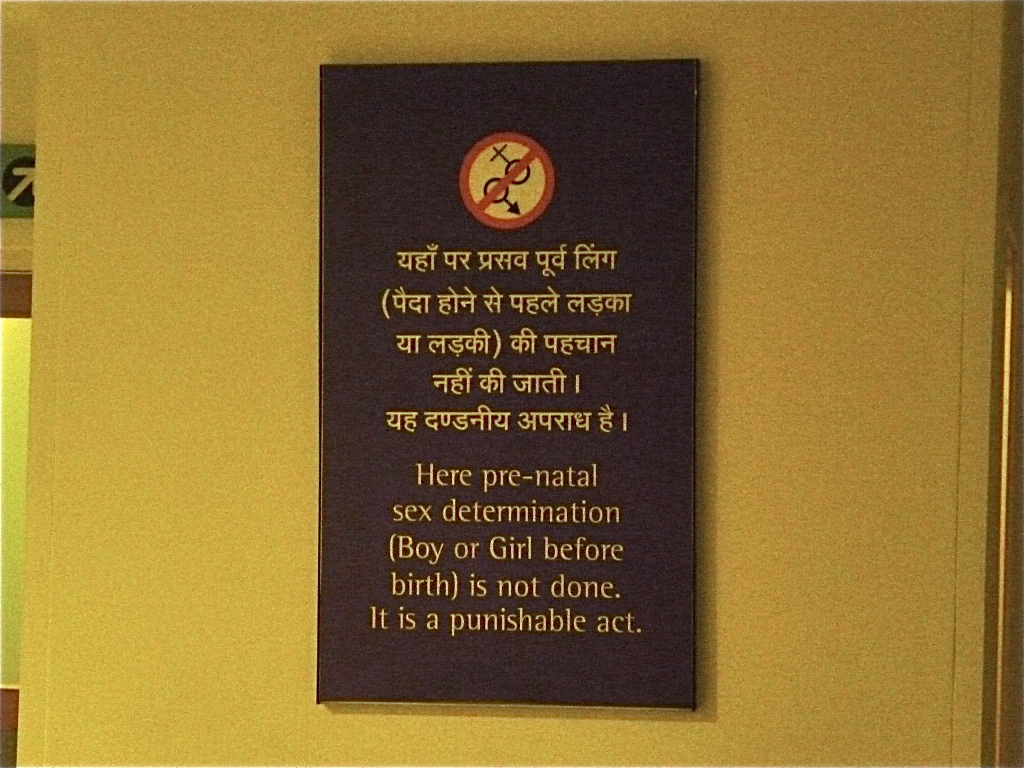
Sex determination ban in India

Prenatal sex determination was banned in India in 1994, under the Pre-Conception and Pre-Natal Diagnostic Techniques Act, 1994. The act aims to prevent sex-selective abortion, which, according to the Indian Ministry of Health and Family Welfare, "has its roots in India's long history of strong patriarchal influence in all spheres of life". Prenatal sex determination has caused the child sex ratio to go down at alarming rates, in India, which is also another factor that led to its banning. However, the Supreme Court of India has accused the Government of India of poor implementation and enforcement of the act. Over time, there has been a substitution effect of more families participating in pre-natal sex determination instead of the previously popular act of female foeticide.

=== China ===
The Chinese government has enacted three laws to try to prevent future occurrences of female infanticide. The Mother and Child Health Care Law of 1994 prevented sex identification of the fetus and prohibited the use of technology for the use of selective abortions based on the fetus's sex in order to protect female infants. The Marriage Law and the Women's Protection Law both prohibit female infanticide and protect women's rights. There is also a campaign started called "Care for Girls" which gives financial support to female-only families and supports equality between the genders. On May 1, 2016, sex determination and sex-selective abortion were prohibited. Doctors are forbidden by the state from revealing the sex of unborn babies in an effort to stop prospective parents from finding out the sex of their child and potentially abort or abandon babies.

== See also ==
- Gender reveal, a celebration party
- Female infanticide, a practice widespread throughout many cultures and times
- Gendercide
