= Transaction payments as a service =

SaaS-based methodology

Transaction payments as a service (TPaaS) is a phrase used to describe a SaaS-based methodology which allows platforms to become their own merchant platforms and provide merchant services directly. This is distinct from payments as a service which aggregates multiple payment technologies into one platform.

== TPaaS layer ==
The TPaaS layer allows organisations to become their own merchant provider, this facilitates functionality that is normally only available to merchant aggregators such as commission splits, merchant of record and instant onboarding.

== See also ==
- Payments as a service
- Electronic bill payment
- E-commerce payment system
- Electronic commerce
- Payment service provider
