= Pre-Conception and Pre-Natal Diagnostic Techniques Act, 1994 =

Indian legislation

Pre-Conception Pre-Natal Diagnostic Techniques Act, 1994

Parliament of India
- Long title: An Act to provide for the prohibition of sex selection, after conception, and for regulation of prenatal diagnostic techniques for the purposes of detecting genetic abnormalities or metabolic disorders or chromosomal abnormalities or certain congenital malformations or sex-linked disorders and for the prevention of their misuse for sex determination leading to female foeticide; and, for matters connected therewith or incidental thereto.
- Enacted by: Parliament of India
- Assented to: 20 September 1994
- Commenced: 1 January 1996

Amended by
- The Pre-Conception and Pre-Natal Diagnostic Techniques (Prohibition Of Sex Selection) Act. 2003
- Status: In force

The Pre-Conception and Pre-Natal Diagnostic Techniques Act, 1994 (PCPNDT) is an Act of the Parliament of India enacted to stop female foeticide and arrest the declining sex ratio in India. The act banned prenatal sex determination. Every genetic counselling centre, genetic laboratory or genetic clinic engaged in counselling or conducting pre-natal diagnostics techniques, like in vitro fertilisation (IVF) with the potential of sex selection (Preimplantation genetic diagnosis) before and after conception, comes under purview of the PCPNDT Act and is banned.

== Female foeticide in India ==
This process began in early 1990 when ultrasound techniques gained widespread use in India. There was a tendency for families to continuously produce children until a male child was born. Foetal sex determination and sex-selective abortion by medical professionals has today grown into a Rs. 1,000 crore industry (US$244 million) in India. Social discrimination against women and a preference for sons have promoted female foeticide in various forms, skewing the sex ratio of the country towards men. According to the decennial Indian census, the sex ratio in the 0–6 age group in India went from 104.0 males per 100 females in 1981, to 105.8 in 1991, to 107.8 in 2001, to 109.4 in 2011. The ratio is significantly higher in certain states such as Punjab and Haryana (126.1 and 122.0, as of 2001).

== Objectives ==
The main purpose of enacting the law is to ban the use of sex selection techniques after conception and prevent the misuse of prenatal diagnostic technique for sex-selective abortions.

== Definitions ==
Sex selection is any act of identifying the sex of the foetus and elimination of the foetus if it is of the unwanted sex.

== Salient features ==
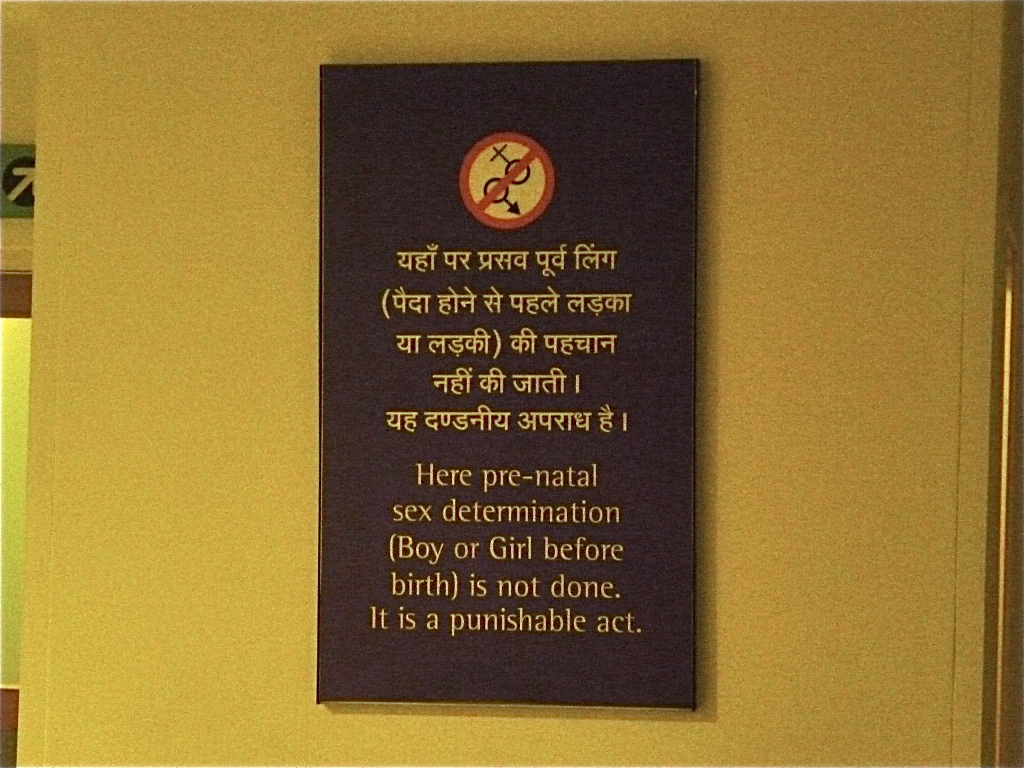
A sign in an Indian hospital stating that prenatal sex determination is a crime.

Offences under this act include conducting or helping in the conduct of prenatal diagnostic technique in the unregistered units, sex selection on a man or woman, conducting PND test for any purpose other than the one mentioned in the act, sale, distribution, supply, renting etc. of any ultra sound machine or any other equipment capable of detecting sex of the foetus. Main provisions in the act are

1. The Act provides for the prohibition of sex selection, before or after conception.
2. It regulates the use of pre-natal diagnostic techniques, like ultrasound and amniocentesis by allowing them their use only to detect:
  1. genetic abnormalities
  2. metabolic disorders
  3. chromosomal abnormalities
  4. certain congenital malformations
  5. haemoglobinopathies
  6. sex linked disorders.
3. No laboratory or centre or clinic will conduct any test including ultrasonography for the purpose of determining the sex of the foetus.
4. No person, including the one conducting the procedure, would communicate the sex of the foetus to the pregnant woman or her relatives by words, signs or any other method.
5. Any person who puts an advertisement for pre-natal and pre-conception sex determination facilities in the form of a notice, circular, label, wrapper or any document, or advertises through interior or other media in electronic or print form or engages in any visible representation made by means of hoarding, wall painting, signal, light, sound, smoke or gas, can be imprisoned for up to three years and fined ₹ 10,000.
6. A complaint may be filed by a appropriate authority authorized by Central Govt or State Government and cognizance then can be taken by the competent court on such complaint. Also, any other person can also make a complaint to the competent court but only with a notice of not less than 15 days to such appropriate authority.

=== Compulsory registration ===
The Act mandates compulsory registration of all diagnostic laboratories, all genetic counselling centres, genetic laboratories, genetic clinics and ultrasound clinics.

== Amendment in 2003 ==
Pre-Natal Diagnostic Techniques (Regulation and Prevention of Misuse) Act, 1994 (PNDT), was amended in 2003 to The Pre-Conception and Pre-Natal Diagnostic Techniques (Prohibition of Sex Selection) Act (PCPNDT Act) to improve the regulation of the technology used in sex selection.

Implications of the amendment are

1. Amendment of the act mainly covered bringing the technique of pre conception sex selection within the ambit of the act
2. Bringing ultrasound within its ambit
3. Empowering the central supervisory board, constitution of state level supervisory board
4. Provision for more stringent punishments
5. Empowering appropriate authorities with the power of civil court for search, seizure and sealing the machines and equipments of the violators
6. Regulating the sale of the ultrasound machines only to registered bodies

== See also ==
- Prenatal sex discernment
- Sex selection
- Sex ratio in India
