= Sex-selective abortion =

Pregnancy termination based on predicted sex

Sex ratio at birth in Japan,China,Korea and Taiwan since 1980

Sex-selective abortion is the practice of terminating a pregnancy based upon the predicted sex of the infant. As the practice overwhelmingly targets female fetuses, sex-selective abortion often specifically refers to female-selective abortion. Sex-selective abortion is closely linked to female infanticide, and is recognized by many human rights organizations as an act of violence against women.

The selective abortion of female fetuses is most common where male children are valued over female children, especially in parts of East Asia and South Asia (particularly in countries such as People's Republic of China, India and Pakistan), as well as in the Caucasus, Western Balkans, and to a lesser extent North America. Based on India's third National Family and Health Survey, results showed that if both partners, mother and father, or just the father, preferred male children, sex-selective abortion was more common. In cases where only the mother prefers sons, this is likely to result in sex-selective neglect in which the child is not likely to survive past infancy.

Sex-selective abortion was first documented in 1975, and became commonplace by the late 1980s in South Korea, Taiwan and China and around the same time or slightly later in India.

Sex-selective abortion affects the human sex ratio—the relative number of males to females in a given age group. This contributes to a shortfall of women, as observed in particular in China and India, the two most populous countries of the world.

Studies and reports on sex-selective abortion often assume that birth-sex ratio—the overall ratio of boys and girls at birth—for a regional population is an indicator of sex-selective abortion. This assumption has been questioned by some scholars. Researchers have shown that in India there are approximately 50,000 to 100,000 female abortions each year, significantly affecting the human sex ratio.

Recent studies have expanded the understanding of this issue by quantifying trends in conditional sex ratios (CSRs) among Asian diaspora populations in Australia, Canada, the UK, and the US, showing that sex selection practices have persisted among diaspora communities from 1999 to 2019. Research into the past four decades of sex-selective abortions in China highlights the significant role these practices have played in shaping the country's demographic profile, despite challenges in estimating exact numbers due to underreporting and the controversial level of sex ratio at birth (SRB).

== Human sex ratio at birth ==
The human sex ratio at birth can vary for natural reasons as well as from sex-selective abortion. In many nations abortion is legal (see above map, dark blue).

Sex-selective abortion affects the human sex ratio—the relative number of males to females in a given age group. Studies and reports that discuss sex-selective abortion are based on the assumption that birth sex ratio—the overall ratio of boys and girls at birth for a regional population, is an indicator of sex-selective abortion.

According to demographic scholarship, the expected birth-sex ratio range is 103 to 107 males to 100 females at birth, with a 2002 estimate giving 106 males to 100 females. Human sex ratio at birth that is significantly different from 106 is often assumed to be correlated to the prevalence and scale of sex-selective abortion, with ratios 108 and above indicating selective abortion of females, and 102 and below indicating selective abortion of males. This assumption is controversial, and the subject of continuing scientific studies.

According to a 2013 study, in 35 out of 61 countries that were surveyed, the sex ratio would be more than 110 males to 100 females if parents could choose the gender of their children.

=== High or low human sex ratio implies sex-selective abortion ===
One school of scholars suggest that any birth sex ratio of boys to girls that is outside the normal 105–107 range, necessarily implies sex-selective abortion. These scholars claim that both the sex ratio at birth and the population sex ratio are remarkably constant in human populations. Significant deviations in birth sex ratios from the normal range can only be explained by manipulation, that is sex-selective abortion.

In a widely cited article, Amartya Sen compared the birth sex ratio in Europe (106) and the United States (105) with those in Asia (107+) and argued that the high sex ratios in East Asia, West Asia and South Asia may be due to excessive female mortality. Sen pointed to research that had shown that if men and women receive similar nutritional and medical attention and good health care then females have better survival rates, and it is the male which is the genetically fragile sex.

Sen estimated 'missing women' from extra women who would have survived in Asia if it had the same ratio of women to men as Europe and the United States. According to Sen, the high birth sex ratio over decades implies a female shortfall of 11% in Asia, or over 100 million women as missing from the 3 billion combined population of South Asia, West Asia, North Africa and China.

=== High or low human sex ratio may be natural ===
Other scholars question whether birth sex ratio outside 103–107 can be due to natural reasons. William James and others suggest that conventional assumptions have been:

- there are equal numbers of X and Y chromosomes in mammalian sperms
- X and Y stand equal chance of achieving conception
- therefore equal number of male and female zygotes are formed, and that
- therefore any variation of sex ratio at birth is due to sex selection between conception and birth.

James cautions that available scientific evidence stands against the above assumptions and conclusions. He reports that there is an excess of males at birth in almost all human populations, and the natural sex ratio at birth is usually between 102 and 108. However the ratio may deviate significantly from this range for natural reasons such as early marriage and fertility, teenage mothers, average maternal age at birth, paternal age, age gap between father and mother, late births, ethnicity, social and economic stress, warfare, environmental and hormonal effects. This school of scholars support their alternate hypothesis with historical data when modern sex-selection technologies were unavailable, as well as birth sex ratio in sub-regions, and various ethnic groups of developed economies. They suggest that direct abortion data should be collected and studied, instead of drawing conclusions indirectly from human sex ratio at birth.

James' hypothesis is supported by historical birth sex ratio data before technologies for ultrasonographic sex-screening were discovered and commercialized in the 1960s and 1970s, as well by reverse abnormal sex ratios currently observed in Africa. Michel Garenne reports that many African nations have, over decades, witnessed birth sex ratios below 100, that is more girls are born than boys. Angola, Botswana and Namibia have reported birth sex ratios between 94 and 99, which is quite different from the presumed 104 to 106 as natural human birth sex ratio.

John Graunt noted that in London over a 35-year period in the 17th century (1628–62), the birth sex ratio was 1.07; while Korea's historical records suggest a birth sex ratio of 1.13, based on 5 million births, in 1920s over a 10-year period. Other historical records from Asia too support James' hypothesis. For example, Jiang et al. claim that the birth sex ratio in China was 116–121 over a 100-year period in the late 18th and early 19th centuries; in the 120–123 range in the early 20th century; falling to 112 in the 1930s.

=== Data on human sex ratio at birth ===
In the United States, the sex ratios at birth over the period 1970–2002 were 105 for the white non-Hispanic population, 104 for Mexican Americans, 103 for African Americans and Native Americans, and 107 for mothers of Chinese or Filipino ethnicity. In the aggregated results of 56 Demographic and Health Surveys in African countries, the birth sex ratio was found to be 103, though there is also considerable country-to-country, and year-to-year variation.

In a 2005 study, U.S. Department of Health and Human Services reported sex ratio at birth in the United States from 1940 over 62 years. This statistical evidence suggested the following: For mothers having their first baby, the total sex ratio at birth was 106 overall, with some years at 107. For mothers having babies after the first, this ratio consistently decreased with each additional baby from 106 towards 103. The age of the mother affected the ratio: the overall ratio was 105 for mothers aged 25 to 35 at the time of birth; while mothers who were below the age of 15 or above 40 had babies with a sex ratio ranging between 94 and 111, and a total sex ratio of 104. This United States study also noted that American mothers of Hawaiian, Filipino, Chinese, Cuban and Japanese ethnicity had the highest sex ratio, with years as high as 114 and average sex ratio of 107 over the 62-year study period. Outside of United States, European nations with extensive birth records, such as Finland, report similar variations in birth sex ratios over a 250-year period, that is from 1751 to 1997 AD.

Female Selective abortions in Asia are predominantly practiced in areas such as Taiwan, China, and India. The Sex ratio at birth in Asia based on worldwide data is 104 and 107 males per 100 females, which was the accepted norm before sex selective abortion was available. Unfortunately, census results from 2000 are still being reviewed and currently unavailable.

In 2017, according to CIA estimates, the countries with the highest birth sex ratio were Liechtenstein (125), Northern Mariana Islands (116), China (114), Armenia (112), Falkland Islands (112), India (112), Grenada (110), Hong Kong (110), Vietnam (110), Albania (109), Azerbaijan (109), San Marino (109), Isle of Man (108), Kosovo (108) and Macedonia (108). Also in 2017 the lowest ratio (i.e. more girls born) was in Nauru at 83. There were ratios of 102 and below in several countries, most of them African countries or Black/African majority population Caribbean countries: Angola, Aruba, Barbados, Bermuda, Burkina Faso, Burundi, Cabo Verde, Cameroon, Cayman Islands, Central African Republic, Chad, Comoros, Republic of the Congo, Côte d'Ivoire, Djibouti, Eritrea, Eswatini, Ethiopia, Gabon, The Gambia, Ghana, Guinea-Bissau, Haiti, Kazakhstan, Lesotho, Liberia, Madagascar, Malawi, Mali, Mauritania, Mozambique, Niger, Puerto Rico, Qatar, Senegal, Sierra Leone, Somalia, South Africa, Togo, Uganda, Zambia.

There is controversy about the notion of the exact natural sex ratio at birth. In a study around 2002, the natural sex ratio at birth was estimated to be close to 1.06 males/female. There is controversy whether sex ratios outside the 103-107 range are due to sex-selection, as suggested by some scholars, or due to natural causes. The claims that unbalanced sex ratios are necessary due to sex selection have been questioned by some researchers. Some researchers argue that an unbalanced sex ratio should not be automatically held as evidence of prenatal sex-selection; Michel Garenne reports that many African nations have, over decades, witnessed birth sex ratios below 100, that is more girls are born than boys. Angola, Botswana and Namibia have reported birth sex ratios between 94 and 99, which is quite different than the presumed "normal" sex ratio, meaning that significantly more girls have been born in such societies.

In addition, in many developing countries there are problems with birth registration and data collection, which can complicate the issue. With regard to the prevalence of sex selection, the media and international attention has focused mainly on a few countries, such as China, India and the Caucasus, ignoring other countries with a significant sex imbalance at birth. For example, Liechtenstein's sex ratio is far worse than that of those countries, but little has been discussed about it, and virtually no suggestions have been made that it may practice sex selection, although it is a very conservative country where women could not vote until 1984. At the same time, there have been accusations that the situation in some countries, such as Georgia, has been exaggerated. In 2017, Georgia' sex ratio at birth was 107, according to CIA statistics.

=== Data reliability ===
The estimates for birth sex ratios, and thus derived sex-selective abortion, are a subject of dispute as well. For example, United States' CIA projects the birth sex ratio for Switzerland to be 106, while the Switzerland's Federal Statistical Office that tracks actual live births of boys and girls every year, reports the latest birth sex ratio for Switzerland as 107. Other variations are more significant; for example, CIA projects the birth sex ratio for Pakistan to be 105, United Nations FPA office claims the birth sex ratio for Pakistan to be 110, while the government of Pakistan claims its average birth sex ratio is 111.

The two most studied nations with high sex ratio and sex-selective abortion are China and India. The CIA estimates a birth sex ratio of 112 for both in recent years. However, The World Bank claims the birth sex ratio for China in 2009 was 120 boys for every 100 girls; while United Nations FPA estimates China's 2011 birth sex ratio to be 118.

For India, the United Nations FPA claims a birth sex ratio of 111 over 2008–10 period, while The World Bank and India's official 2011 Census reports a birth sex ratio of 108. These variations and data reliability is important as a rise from 108 to 109 for India, or 117 to 118 for China, each with large populations, represent a possible sex-selective abortion of about 100,000 girls.

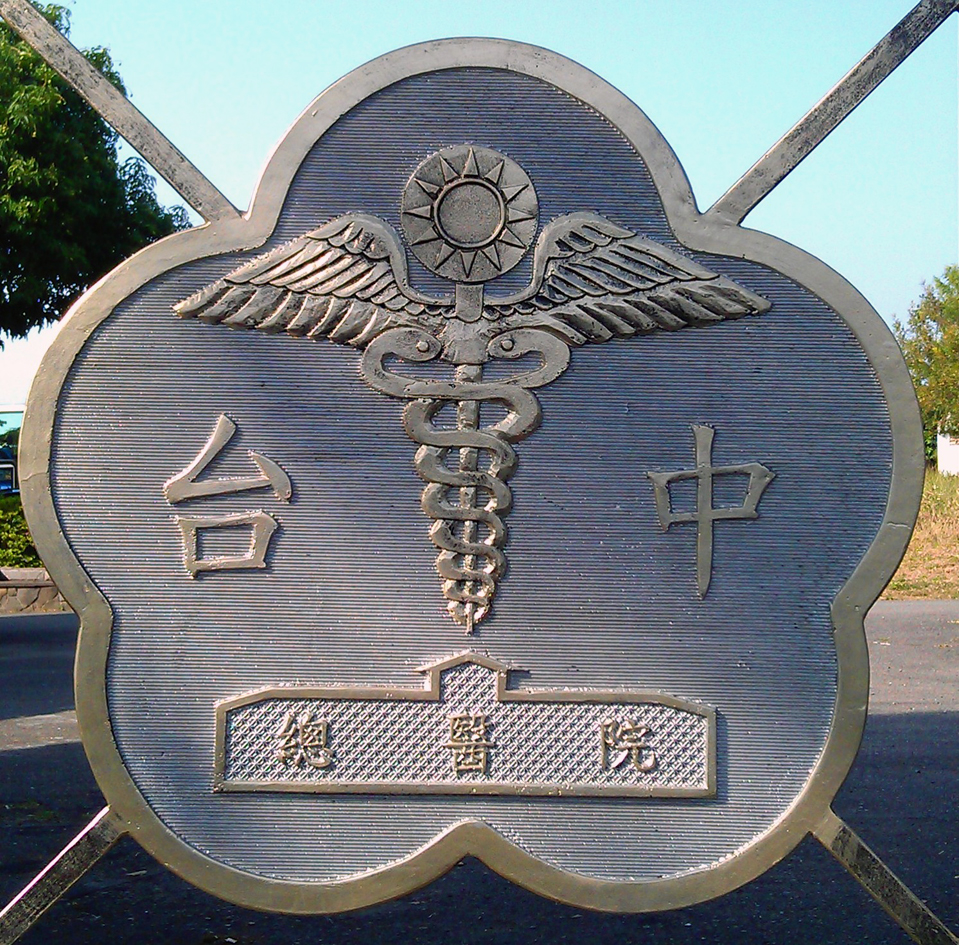

Bias is due to the unreported births in hospitals which makes a slight difference on the data they report vs the census. If parents obtain sex testing before birth, and abortion was made and it was based on female fetus, it is more likely for the abortion to happen in the hospital for safety purposes and would have been reported. With no comparative data with hospitals vs nonhospital births the length of biased would be unable to determine opposed to those countries where most hospital births occur and are actually reported.

Underreporting of female births may lead to deceptively high sex ratios.

== Prenatal sex discernment ==
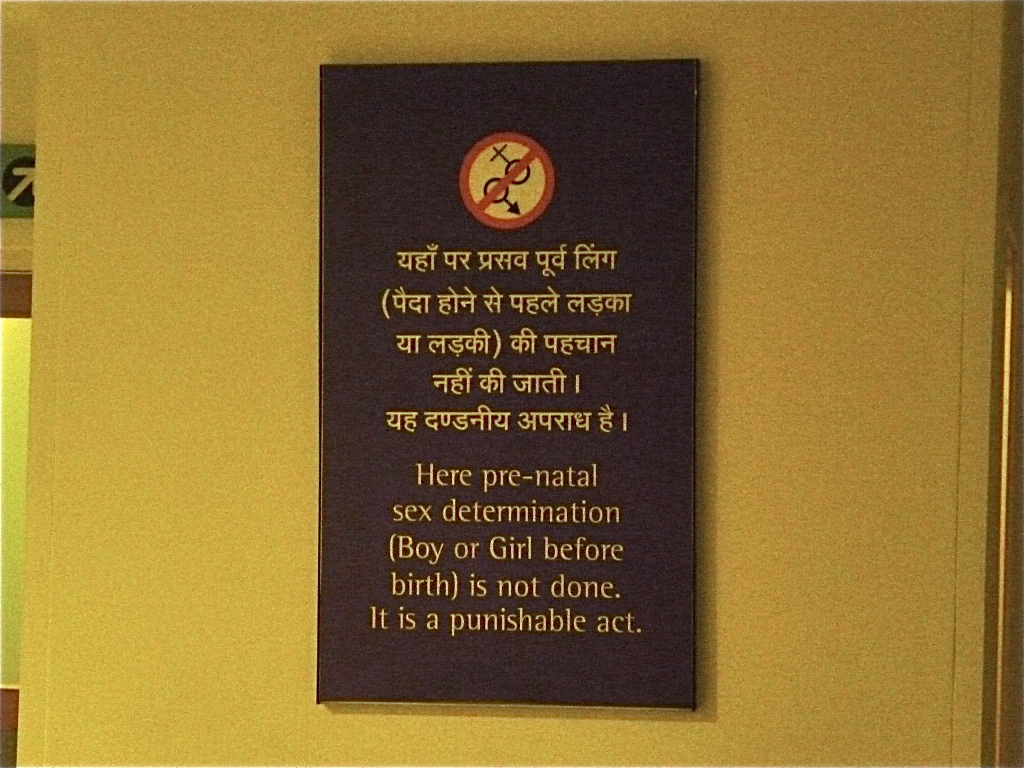
Sign in an Indian hospital stating that prenatal sex determination is not done there and is illegal

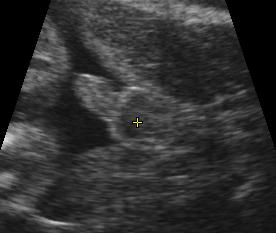
Ultrasonography image showing the fetus is a boy

The earliest post-implantation test, cell free fetal DNA testing, involves taking a blood sample from the mother and isolating the small amount of fetal DNA that can be found within it. When performed after week seven of pregnancy, this method is about 98% accurate.

Obstetric ultrasonography, either transvaginally or transabdominally, checks for various markers of fetal sex. It can be performed at or after week 12 of pregnancy. At this point, 3/4 of fetal sexes can be correctly determined, according to a 2001 study. Accuracy for males is approximately 50% and for females almost 100%. When performed after week 13 of pregnancy, ultrasonography gives an accurate result in almost 100% of cases.

The most invasive measures are chorionic villus sampling (CVS) and amniocentesis, which involve testing of the chorionic villus (found in the placenta) and amniotic fluid, respectively. Both techniques typically test for chromosomal disorders but can also reveal the sex of the child and are performed early in the pregnancy. However, they are often more expensive and more dangerous than blood sampling or ultrasonography, so they are seen less frequently than other sex determination techniques.

Prenatal sex determination is restricted in many countries, and so is the communication of the sex of the fetus to the pregnant woman or her family, in order to prevent sex selective abortion. In India, prenatal sex determination is regulated under the Pre-conception and Prenatal Diagnostic Techniques (Prohibition of Sex Selection) Act 1994.

Availability

China launched its first ultrasonography machine in 1979. Chinese health care clinics began introducing ultrasound technologies that could be used to determine prenatal sex in 1982. By 1991, Chinese companies were producing 5,000 ultrasonography machines per year. Almost every rural and urban hospital and family planning clinics in China had a good quality sex discernment equipment by 2001.

The launch of ultrasonography technology in India too occurred in 1979, but its expansion was slower than China. Ultrasound sex discernment technologies were first introduced in major cities of India in the 1980s, its use expanded in India's urban regions in the 1990s, and became widespread in the 2000s.

== Reasons for sex-selective abortion ==
According to the 2012 report of the United Nations Fund for Population Activities on sex imbalances at birth, there are three causal "preconditions" for the occurrence of sex-selective abortion:

- Technical feasibility of the practice given the availability of abortion methods and prenatal sex-screening technologies (e.g., obstetric ultrasonography, cell-free fetal DNA, amniocentesis).
- Socioeconomic factors that make selecting for the sex of a child potentially advantageous to the parents and the family, e.g., inherence rules, patronymic transmission, dowry systems, social preference of family composition.
- Low or decreasing fertility. Since each child that is conceived has a roughly equal chance of developing male or female, lower fertility rates mean that there is a higher chance of not having at least one son, potentially increasing the pressure to select for sex with fewer children. Low fertility can be a result of social norms of family size, rising marginal costs of an additional child, or birth control policies.

=== Socioeconomic reasons for son preference and daughter aversion ===
==== Cultural preference ====
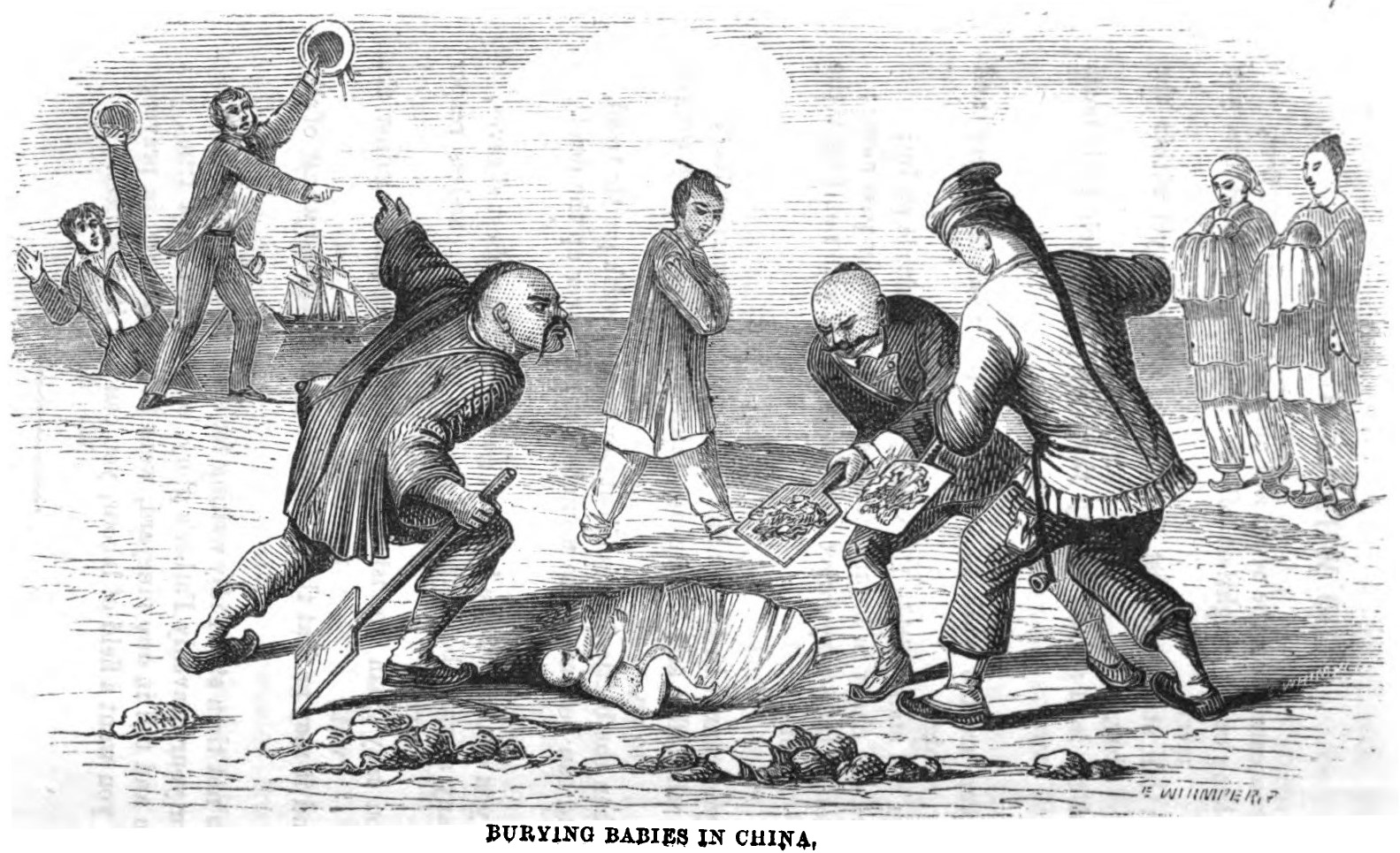
Burying Babies in China (p.40, March 1865, XXII). There is a long tradition of female infanticide in China.

Infanticide committed by throwing an infant into the Ganges river

The reason for intensifying sex-selection abortion in China and India can be seen through history and cultural background. Generally, before the information era, male babies were preferred because they provided manual labor and continuation of the family lineage. Labor is still important in developing nations as China and India, but when it comes to family lineage, it is of great importance.

The selective abortion of female fetuses is most common in areas where cultural norms value male children over female children for a variety of social and economic reasons. A son is often preferred as an "asset" since he can earn and support the family; a daughter is a "liability" since she will be married off to another family, and so will not contribute financially to her parents. Sex selective female abortion is a continuation, in a different form, of a practice of female infanticide or withholding of postnatal health care for girls in certain households. Furthermore, in some cultures sons are expected to take care of their parents in their old age. These factors are complicated by the effect of diseases on child sex ratio, where communicable and noncommunicable diseases affect males and females differently. In parts of India and Pakistan, there are social norms such as purdah, which stipulate that female seclusion and confinement to the home is necessary. Such practices are prevalent among some Muslim and Hindu communities in South Asia. When females interact with men, or are believed to do so, the "family honor" is tarnished.

Historically, in many South Asian populations, women were allocated a very low status, evidenced through practices such as sati, an ancient funeral custom where a widow immolated herself on her husband's pyre or committed suicide in another fashion shortly after her husband's death. Such societies, in placing almost no value on females, encouraged parents to commit infanticide of girls or to abandon them. The modern practice of sex-selective abortion is therefore a continuation of other historical practices. During the 19th century, in the Northwest British India, one-fourth of the population preserved only half the daughters, while other 3/4th of the population had balanced sex ratio. There were 118 males per 100 females. This is comparable to the contemporary sex ratio in the area, now divided between India and Pakistan.

Chinese culture is deeply patriarchal. Pre-modern Chinese society was predominantly patriarchal and patrilineal from at least the 11th century BC onwards. There has long been a son preference in China, leading to high rates of female infanticide, as well as a strong tradition of restricting the freedom of movement of women, particularly upper-class women, manifested through the practice of foot binding. Although the legal and social standing of women have greatly improved in the 20th century, son preference remains still strong, and the situation was aggravated by the one child policy.

Interpretations of Confucianism have been argued to contribute to the low status of women. The gender roles prescribed in the Three Obediences and Four Virtues became a cornerstone of the family, and thus, societal stability. Starting from the Han period, Confucians began to teach that a virtuous woman was supposed to follow the males in her family: the father before her marriage, the husband after she marries, and her sons in widowhood. In the later dynasties, more emphasis was placed on the virtue of chastity. The Song dynasty Confucian Cheng Yi stated that: "To starve to death is a small matter, but to lose one's chastity is a great matter." The "cult of chastity" accordingly, condemned many widows to poverty and loneliness by placing a social stigma on remarriage.

In modern East Asia, a large part of the pattern of preferences leading to this practice can be condensed simply as a desire to have a male heir. Monica Das Gupta (2005) observes, from 1989 birth data for China, there was no evidence of selective abortion of female fetuses among firstborn children. However, there was a strong preference for a boy if the first born was a girl.

==== Dowry ====
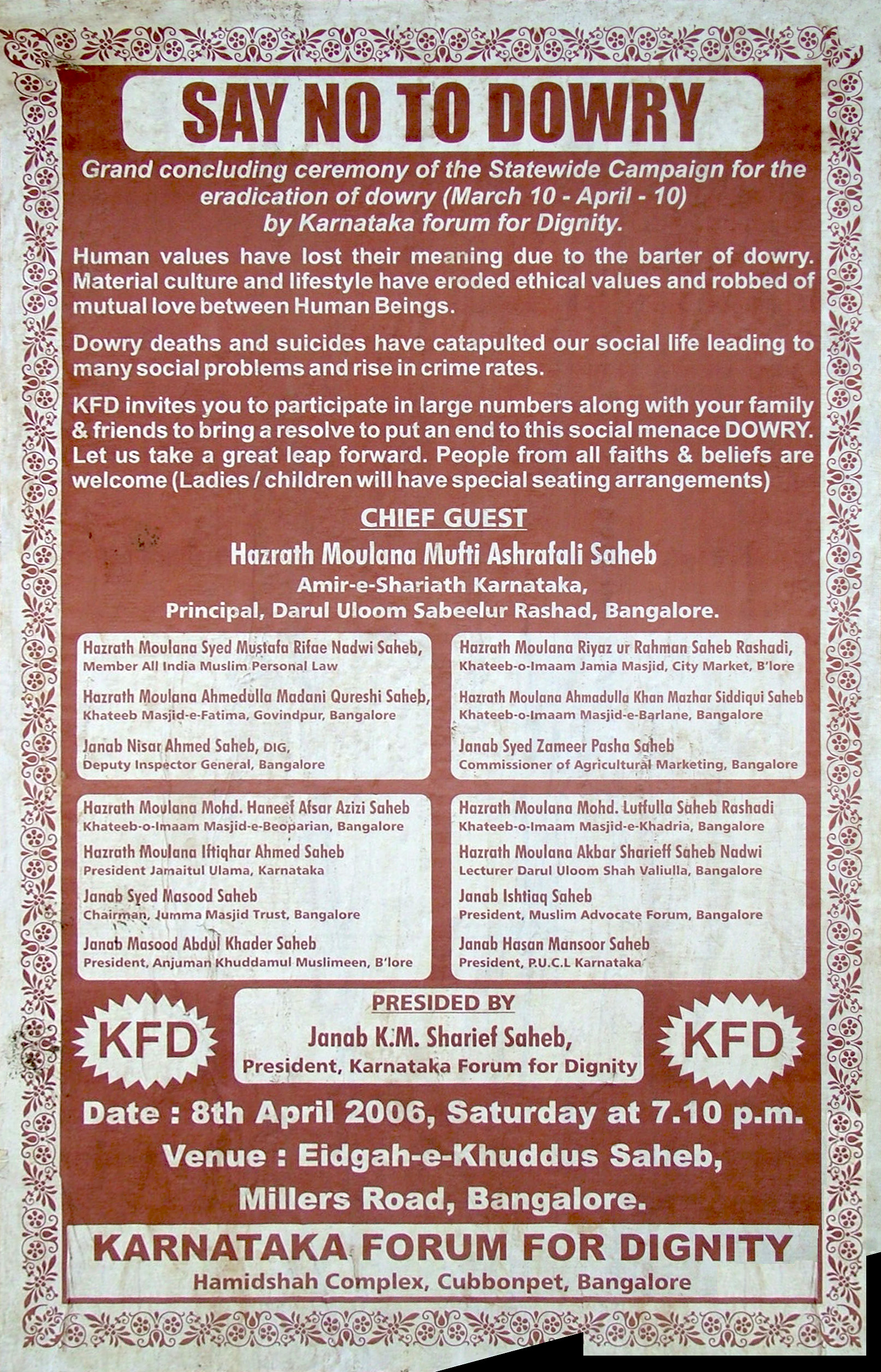
A social awareness campaign in India against dowries

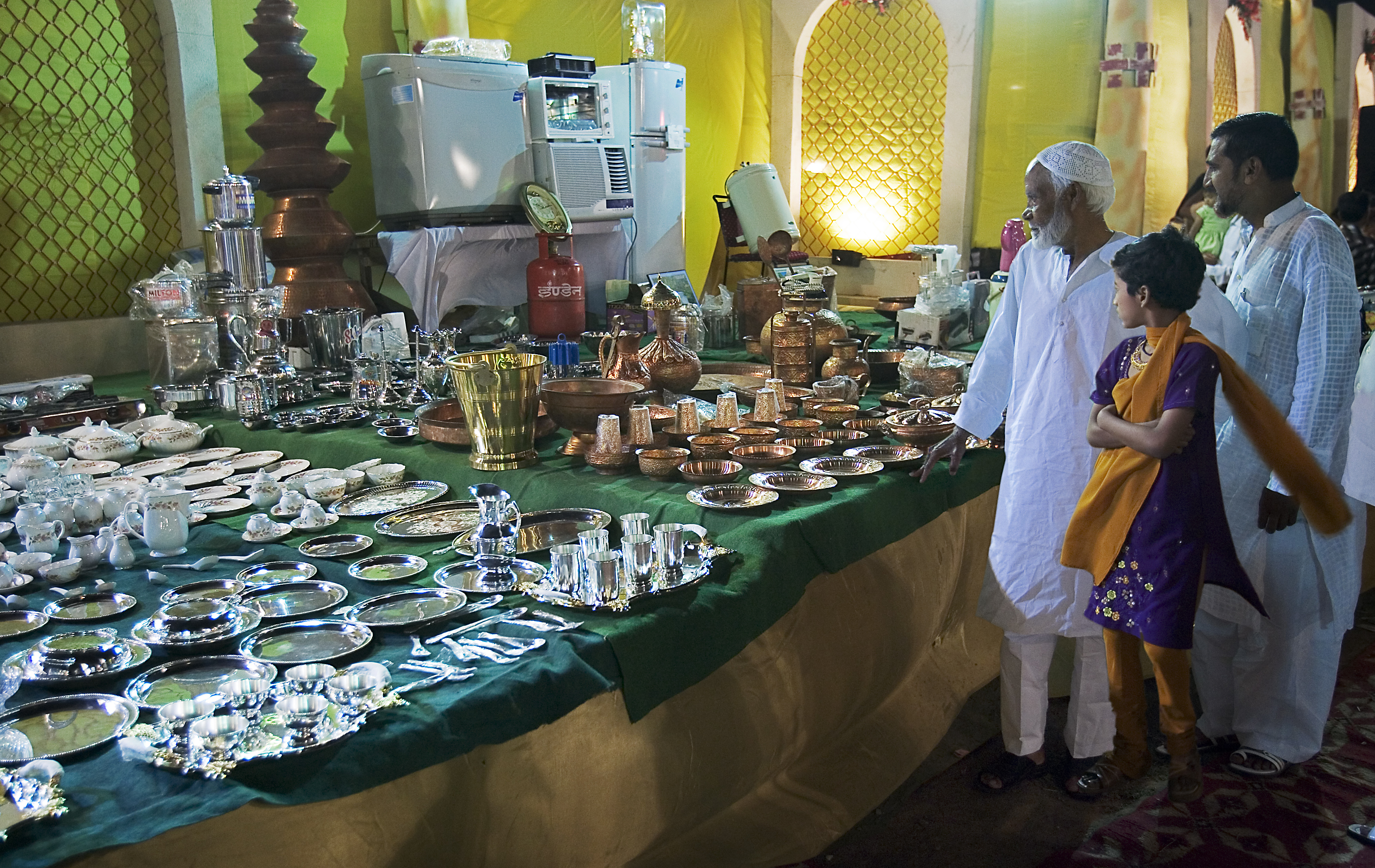
Wedding gifts for the son of the Imam of Delhi, India, with soldiers and 2000 guests. Large dowries are expected among several populations in South Asia, especially in India and Pakistan.

Dowry is the property that parents of a female transfer at her marriage. Dowry is an ancient practice, that has been common in many cultures around the world, and which is today prevalent especially in South Asia. The custom of dowry is most common in cultures that are strongly patrilineal and that expect women to reside with or near their husband's family (patrilocality).

Kirti Singh states that dowry is widely considered to be both a cause and a consequence of son preference, and this may lead to girls being unwanted, sex selective abortion, female infanticide or abuse of female children.

The dowry system in India is a major part of Indian culture and refers to the durable goods, cash, and real or movable property that the bride's family gives to the bridegroom, his parents, or his relatives as a condition of the marriage. Dowry consists of a payment in cash or some kind of gifts given to the bridegroom's family along with the bride and includes cash, jewelry, electrical appliances, furniture, bedding, crockery, utensils and other household items that help the newlyweds set up their home. Disputes regarding dowry sometimes lead to dowry deaths.

==== Trivers–Willard hypothesis ====
The Trivers–Willard hypothesis argues that resource availability affects male reproductive success more than female and that, consequently, parents should prefer males when resources are plentiful and females when resources are scarce. This has been applied to resource differences between individuals in a society and also to resource differences between societies. Empirical evidence is mixed, with higher support in better studies, according to Cronk in a 2007 review. One example: in a 1997 study of a group with a preference for females was Romani in Hungary, a low-status group. They "had a female-biased sex ratio at birth, were more likely to abort a fetus after having had one or more daughters, nursed their daughters longer, and sent their daughters to school for longer."

=== Birth control policies ===
==== Worries about overpopulation and poverty ====
In the 1950s, American policymakers and philanthropists worried that overpopulation would lead to poverty and therefore to Communism in developing countries. Population control became a mission of organizations such as the Population Council, Population Crisis Committee, Ford Foundation, World Bank, UNFPA, USAID or International Planned Parenthood Federation. Around 1970, under pressure from the United States, many poor countries allowed or encouraged abortion and sterilization, using coercion in many cases including the Indian emergency.

Scholars observed the "stopping rule" that many couples stopped having children after they had a son. Sex determination was then advocated as a method of population control, in particular by Paul R. Ehrlich in The Population Bomb. Western organizations helped organize and fund family planning in India, promoting prenatal sex determination by amniocentesis, which led to many sex-selective abortions. In 1979, UNFPA pledged $50 million for family planning in China. This helped China launch the One-child policy, leading to many abortions, including forced abortions.

==== One-child policy ====
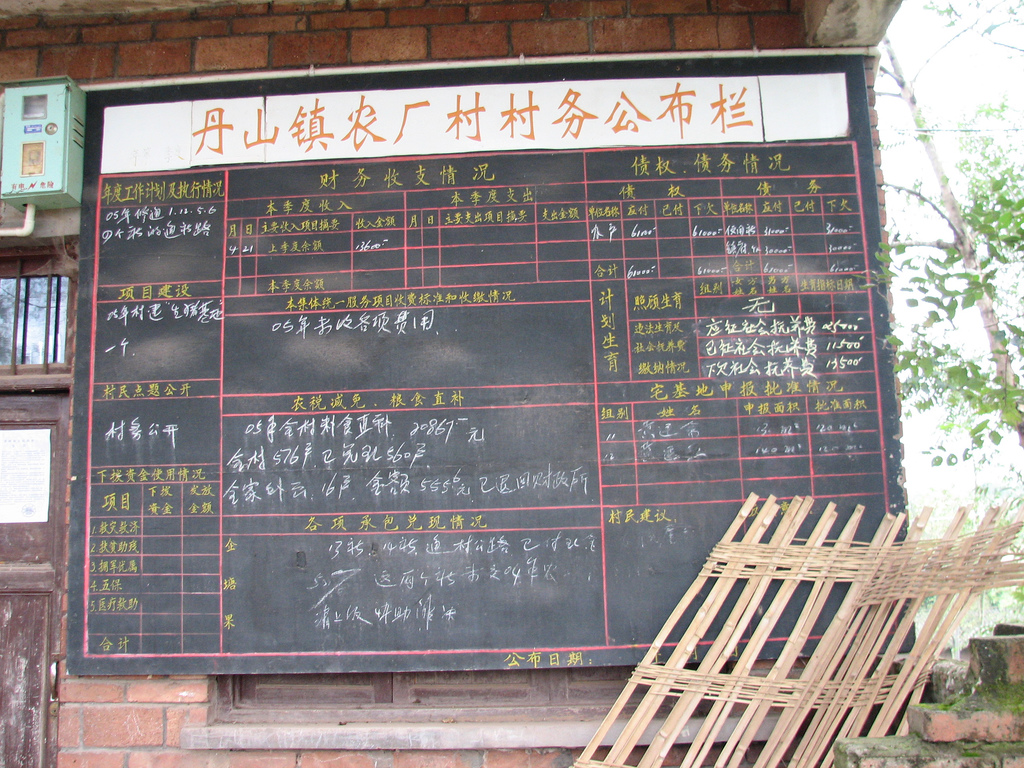
The one child policy in China has contributed to the imbalanced sex ratios. Image shows a community bulletin board in Nonguang Village, Sichuan province, China, keeping track of the town's female population, listing recent births by name and noting that several thousand yuan of fines for unauthorized births remain unpaid from the previous year.

Following the 1949 creation of the People's Republic of China, the issue of population control came into the national spotlight. In the early years of the Republic, leaders believed that telling citizens to reduce their fertility was enough, repealing laws banning contraception and instead promoting its use. However, the contraceptives were not widely available, both because of lack of supply and because of cultural taboo against discussing sex. Efforts were slowed following the famine of 1959–61 but were resumed shortly thereafter with virtually the same results. Then, in 1964, the Family Planning Office was established to enforce stricter guidelines regarding fertility and it was moderately successful.

In 1979, the government adopted the One-Child Policy, which limited many families to one child, unless specified by provincial regulations. It was instituted as an attempt to boost the Chinese economy. Under it, families who break rules regarding the number of children they are allowed are given various punishments (primarily monetary), dependent upon the province in which they live.

The sex ratios of a province are largely determined by the type of restriction placed upon the family, pointing to the conclusion that much of the imbalance in sex ratio in China can be attributed to the policy. Research by Junhong (2001) found that many parents are willing to pay to ensure that their child is male (especially if their first child is female), but will not do the same to ensure their child is female. Likely, fear of the harsh monetary punishments of the One-Child Policy make ensuring a son's birth a smart investment. Therefore, son's cultural and economic importance to families and the large expenses associated with multiple children are primary factors leading to China's disparate sex ratio.

In 2013, China announced plans to formally change the One-Child policy, making it less stringent. The National People's Congress has changed the policy to allow couples to have two children, so long as one of the partners is an only child. This change was not sparked by sex ratios, but rather by an aging population that is causing the workforce to become increasingly smaller. It is estimated that this new law will lead to two million more births per year and could cause a baby boom in China. In 2015, China officially relaxed its one child law. Unfortunately, many of China's social problems are based on overpopulation. So, it is unclear if this new law will actually lead to women being more valued in Chinese society as the number of citizens increases.

=== Variations in sex characteristics ===
Termination can occur due to genetic testing, including pre-implantation genetic diagnosis and non-invasive prenatal testing, finding atypical sex chromosomes such as XXY (Klinefelter syndrome) or monosomy X (Turner syndrome). One may also choose to terminate a pregnancy after the fetus is revealed to be intersex once ambiguous genitals appear on ultrasound. One may opt for termination due to religious belief in a strict male-female binary. For heritable conditions such as androgen insensitivity syndrome (AIS) running in families, carriers may abort pregnancies with AIS to prevent the condition from being passed down. Some choose to terminate pregnancy due to prognosis; for instance, Turner syndrome and Klienfelter syndrome both cause infertility, Turner syndrome may cause and heart and kidney abnormalities, and Klinefelters can cause issues in psychological development. Fetuses with these chromosomal differences are more likely to be aborted than those with sex chromosome differences considered less severe. A literature review found that, on average, 68 percent of patients choose to continue their pregnancy if XYY syndrome was identified compared to an average of 31 percent for Klinefelter syndrome.

The way information is presented may also lead one to opt for abortion. One Israeli genetic counsellor describes her experience saying, "I tell parents, 'I'll give you all the information you need to understand what it is and to ultimately make a decision that you will be able to stand behind regarding the continuation of this pregnancy, whether you continue the pregnancy as usual or you choose to terminate it'. It is a terrible thing for people to hear, because I'm already giving them the option to terminate the pregnancy, so it's clear that there is some sort of [problem]." Advocacy organisations can play a role in providing information which can impact patient decisions. For instance, a representative of the Klinefelter's Syndrome Association describes how most who contact their association continue their pregnancy. The organization works with doctors because "generally that's where the negative information comes from."

== Societal effects ==
=== Missing women ===
The idea of "missing women" was first suggested by Amartya Sen, one of the first scholars to study high sex ratios and their causes globally, in 1990. In order to illustrate the gravity of the situation, he calculated the number of women that were not alive because of sex-selective abortion or discriminatory practices. He found that there were 11 percent fewer women than there "should" have been, if China had the natural sex ratio. This figure, when combined with statistics from around the world, led to a finding of over 100 million missing women. In other words, by the early 1990s, the number of missing women was "larger than the combined casualties of all famines in the twentieth century" (Sen 1990).

This has led to particular concern due to a critical shortage of wives. In some rural areas, there is already a shortage of women, which is tied to migration into urban areas (Park and Cho 1995). In South Korea and Taiwan, high male sex ratios and declining birth rates over several decades have led to cross-cultural marriage between local men and foreign women from countries such as mainland China, Vietnam and the Philippines. However, sex-selective abortion is not the only cause of this phenomenon; it is also related to migration and declining fertility.

=== Trafficking, forced marriage and sex work ===
Some scholars argue that as the proportion of women to men decreases globally, there will be an increase in trafficking and sex work (both forced and self-elected), as many men will be willing to do more to obtain a sexual partner (Junhong 2001). Already, there are reports of women from Vietnam, Myanmar, and North Korea systematically trafficked to mainland China and Taiwan and sold into forced marriages. Moreover, Ullman and Fidell (1989) suggested that pornography and sex-related crimes of violence (i.e., rape and molestation) would also increase with an increasing sex ratio.

=== Widening of the gender social gap ===
As Park and Cho (1995) note, families in areas with high sex ratios that have mostly sons tend to be smaller than those with mostly daughters (because the families with mostly sons appear to have used sex-selective techniques to achieve their "ideal" composition). Particularly in poor areas, large families tend to have more problems with resource allocation, with daughters often receiving fewer resources than sons. Blake (1989) is credited for noting the relationship between family size and childhood "quality." Therefore, if families with daughters continue to be predominantly large, it is likely that the social gap between genders will widen due to traditional cultural discrimination and lack of resource availability.

Guttentag and Secord (1983) hypothesized that when the proportion of males throughout the world is greater, there is likely to be more violence and war.

=== Potential positive effects ===
In Taiwan,prior to sex screening and abortion legalization, parents wanting a son had to keep giving birth until getting a son, leading to many unwanted daughters which were more likely to receive worse healthcare and nutrition. This was largely replaced by sex-selective abortions by the late 1980s/early 1990s, leading to a lower neonatal death rate for girls.

Some scholars believe that when sex ratios are high, women actually become valued more because of their relative shortage. Park and Cho (1995) suggest that as women become more scarce, they may have "increased value for conjugal and reproductive functions" (75). Eventually, this could lead to better social conditions, followed by the birth of more women and sex ratios moving back to natural levels. This claim is supported by the work of demographer Nathan Keifitz. Keifitz (1983) wrote that as women become fewer, their relative position in society will increase. However, to date, no data has supported this claim.

It has been suggested by Belanger (2002) that sex-selective abortion may have positive effects on the mother choosing to abort the female fetus. This is related to the historical duty of mothers to produce a son in order to carry on the family name. As previously mentioned, women gain status in society when they have a male child, but not when they have a female child. Oftentimes, bearing of a son leads to greater legitimacy and agency for the mother. In some regions of the world where son preference is especially strong, sonless women are treated as outcasts. In this way, sex-selective abortion is a way for women to select for male fetuses, helping secure greater family status.

Goodkind (1999) argues that sex-selective abortion should not be banned purely because of its discriminatory nature. Instead, he argues, we must consider the overall lifetime possibilities of discrimination. In fact, it is possible that sex-selective abortion takes away much of the discrimination women would face later in life. Since families have the option of selecting for the fetal sex they desire, if they choose not to abort a female fetus, she is more likely to be valued later in life. In this way, sex-selective abortion may be a more humane alternative to infanticide, abandonment, or neglect. Goodkind (1999) poses an essential philosophical question, "if a ban were enacted against prenatal sex testing (or the use of abortion for sex-selective purposes), how many excess postnatal deaths would a society be willing to tolerate in lieu of whatever sex-selective abortions were avoided?"

=== Controversies ===
There are many controversies surrounding sex-selective abortion. Just like the practice of sex-selective abortion has been criticized, the solutions proposed or enacted by governments have also been criticized. Eklund & Purewal argued that the response to a patriarchal practice (sex selection) should not be another patriarchal practice (restricting women's reproductive rights), as such a situation creates a cycle: women's social status is lowered, which in turn leads to more sex-selective abortions. The association of public discourse on sex-selective abortion with the anti-abortion movement also complicates the situation. Furthermore, access to safe abortion is seen by some as important from a public health perspective; in India, although the abortion law is relatively liberal, most efforts are put into preventing sex-selective abortion, rather than adequate access to safe abortion, as a result nearly 78% of all abortions in India take place outside of health facilities, with such unsafe abortions representing the third largest cause of maternal death in India. Another controversy in that of population planning campaigns such as the one child policy in China, and efforts from the governments of several Asian countries, including India and South Korea, from the 1970s onward to limit the number of children a family could have, which have intensified the desire to quickly have a son. An article by Al Jazeera titled "How Western family planners helped curb the birth of girls in developing countries, the effects of which are felt today" claimed that it was such population policies (which included forced sterilization), which were fully supported, even pushed by the West, that contributed to unbalanced sex ratios.

== Laws, campaigns and policies against sex-selective abortion ==
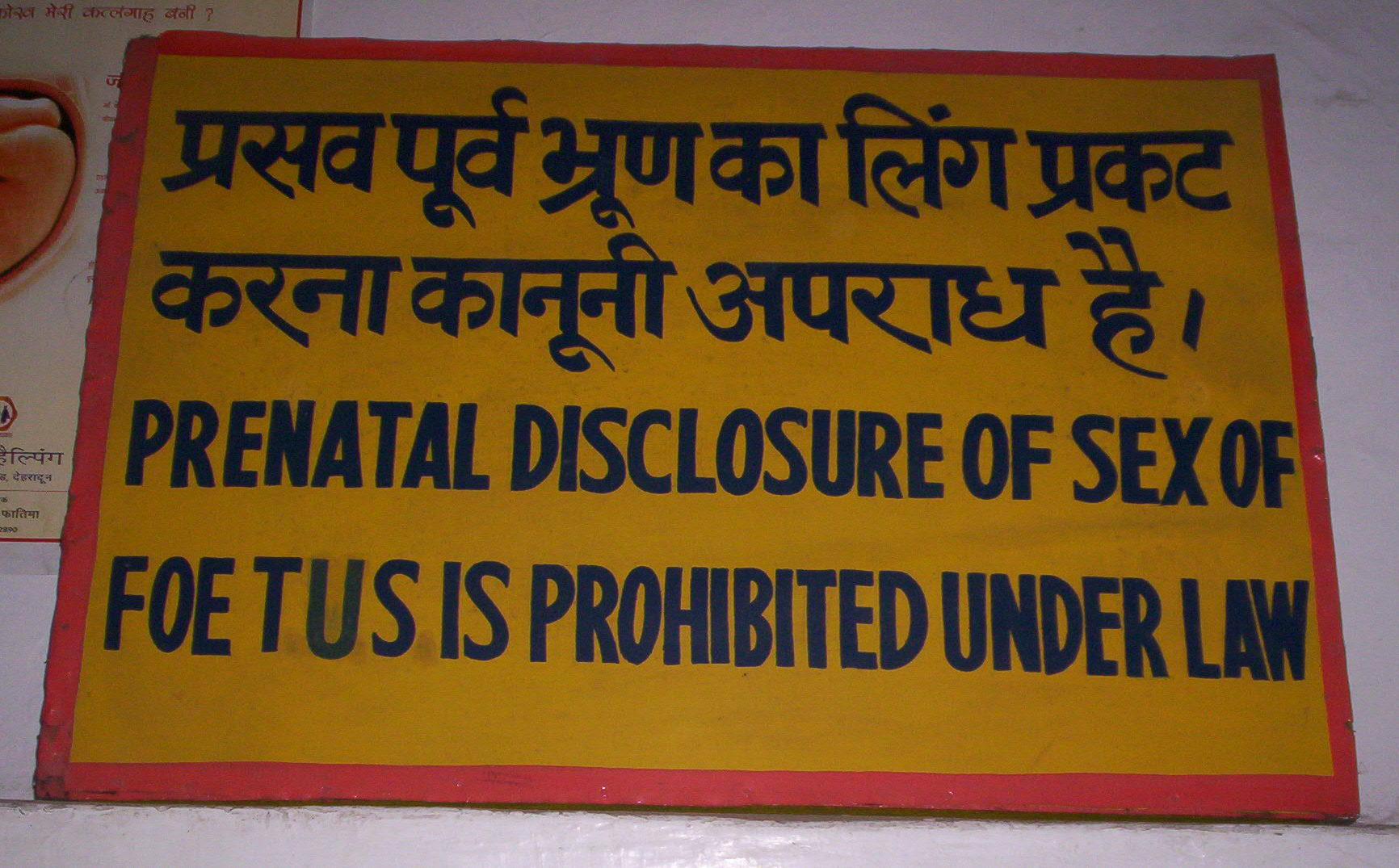
Sign in an Indian clinic reading "Prenatal disclosure of sex of foetus is prohibited under law" in English and Hindi

=== International ===
The practice of prenatal sex selection has been condemned internationally. It is often seen as a result of discriminatory social views which consider females inferior to males. In 1994 over 180 states signed the Programme of Action of the International Conference on Population and Development, agreeing to "eliminate all forms of discrimination against the girl child". In 2011 the resolution of PACE's Committee on Equal Opportunities for Women and Men condemned the practice of prenatal sex selection.

=== By country ===
Many nations have attempted to address sex-selective abortion rates through a combination of media campaigns and policy initiatives.

Australia

In 2017, Australian Conservatives Senator Cory Bernardi moved a motion to ban sex-selective abortion. The motion was voted down (10–36).

In October 2025, New South Wales John Ruddick MLC introduced a Bill for an Act to prohibit the performance of terminations for the purposes of sex selection.

Canada

In 2013, Conservative MP Mark Warawa introduced a motion condemning discrimination against females through sex-selective abortion but which ultimately never came to a vote. In 2021, Conservative Cathay Wagantall introduced a private member's bill that would prohibit a medical practitioner from performing a sex-selective abortion. Although the bill was defeated 248-82, a majority of Conservative MPs voted in favour of the bill.

USA

The United States Congress has debated legislation that would outlaw the practice. The legislation ultimately failed to pass in the House of Representatives.

On the state level, laws against sex-selective abortions have been passed in a number of U.S. states; the law passed in Arizona in 2011 prohibits both sex-selective and race-selective abortion.

United Kingdom

The law on sex-selective abortion is unresolved in the United Kingdom. In order for an abortion to be legal, doctors need to show that continuing the pregnancy could threaten the physical or mental health of the mother. In a recent case, two doctors were caught on camera offering a sex-selective abortion but the Director of Public Prosecution deemed it not in the public interest to proceed with the prosecution. Following this incident, MPs voted 181 to 1 for a Bill put forward by Tessa Munt and 11 other MPs aiming to end confusion about the legality of this practice. Organisations such as BPAS and Abortion Rights have been lobbying for the decriminalisation of sex-selective abortions.

China

China's government has increasingly recognized its role in a reduction of the national sex ratio. As a result, since 2005, it has sponsored a "boys and girls are equal campaign." For example, in 2000, the Chinese government began the "Care for Girls" Initiative. Furthermore, several levels of government have been modified to protect the "political, economic, cultural, and social" rights of women. Finally, the Chinese government has enacted policies and interventions to help reduce the sex ratio at birth. In 2005, sex-selective abortion was made illegal in China. This came in response to the ever-increasing sex ratio and a desire to try to detract from it and reach a more normal ratio. The sex ratio among firstborn children in urban areas from 2000 to 2005 did not rise at all, so there is hope that this movement is taking hold across the nation.

UNICEF and UNFPA have partnered with the Chinese government and grassroots-level women's groups such as All China Women's Federation to promote gender equality in policy and practice, as well engage various social campaigns to help lower birth sex ratio and to reduce excess female child mortality rates.

India

In India, according to a 2007 study by MacPherson, Prenatal Diagnostic Techniques Act (PCPNDT Act) was highly publicized by NGOs and the government. Many of the ads used depicted abortion as violent, creating fear of abortion itself within the population. The ads focused on the religious and moral shame associated with abortion. MacPherson claims this media campaign was not effective because some perceived this as an attack on their character, leading to many becoming closed off, rather than opening a dialogue about the issue. This emphasis on morality, claims MacPherson, increased fear and shame associated with all abortions, leading to an increase in unsafe abortions in India.

The government of India, in a 2011 report, has begun better educating all stakeholders about its MTP and PCPNDT laws. In its communication campaigns, it is clearing up public misconceptions by emphasizing that sex determination is illegal, but abortion is legal for certain medical conditions in India. The government is also supporting implementation of programs and initiatives that seek to reduce gender discrimination, including media campaign to address the underlying social causes of sex selection.

Other recent policy initiatives adopted by numerous states of India, claims Guilmoto, attempt to address the assumed economic disadvantage of girls by offering support to girls and their parents. These policies provide conditional cash transfer and scholarships only available to girls, where payments to a girl and her parents are linked to each stage of her life, such as when she is born, completion of her childhood immunization, her joining school at grade 1, her completing school grades 6, 9 and 12, her marriage past age 21. Some states are offering higher pension benefits to parents who raise one or two girls. Different states of India have been experimenting with various innovations in their girl-driven welfare policies. For example, the state of Delhi adopted a pro-girl policy initiative (locally called Laadli scheme), which initial data suggests may be lowering the birth sex ratio in the state.

=== Interference with the regulation of abortion ===
Many scholars have noted the difficulty in reconciling the discriminatory nature of sex-selective abortion with the right of women to have control over their own bodies. This conflict manifests itself primarily when discussing laws about sex-selective abortion. Weiss (1995:205) writes: "The most obvious challenge sex-selective abortion represents for pro-choice feminists is the difficulty of reconciling a pro-choice position with moral objections one might have to sex selective abortion (especially since it has been used primarily on female fetuses), much less the advocacy of a law banning sex-selective abortion." As a result, arguments both for and against sex-selective abortion are typically highly reflective of one's own personal beliefs about abortion in general. Warren (1985:104) argues that there is a difference between acting within one's rights and acting upon the most morally sound choice, implying that sex-selective abortion might be within rights but not morally sound. Warren also notes that, if we are to ever reverse the trend of sex-selective abortion and high sex ratios, we must work to change the patriarchy-based society which breeds the strong son preference.

Laws against sex-selective abortion, especially those that exist in some U.S. states, are controversial, because it is not clear how they can be enforced, and pro-choice activists argue that such laws are brought by anti-abortion movement forces who are using this as a pretext to restrict women's access to safe and legal abortion and to harass doctors who perform abortions: NARAL states that "For many years, anti-choice lawmakers have tried to ban abortion using every possible reason and excuse –including, now, on the grounds of purported concern about race or sex selection." There is concern that such bans may put women who seek sex-selective abortions in danger because they may seek unsafe abortions, and that these bans do not address the root cause of sex-selective abortion, including the pregnant women's fear that they or their future daughters will suffer abuse, violence and stigmatization.

== Situation in selected countries and regions ==
The total numbers of "missing women" are about 11.9 million and 10.6 million in China and India respectively, out of 23 million world-wide, according to a 2019 study. Given that the total number of recorded abortions is much lower than that, some dispute those numbers.

Imbalanced birth sex ratios are observed in some European countries. In 2017, the countries with the most imbalanced ratios were Liechtenstein, Armenia, Albania, Azerbaijan, San Marino, Kosovo and North Macedonia; with Liechtenstein having the most imbalanced sex ratio in the world.

Sex selective abortion based on son preference is significant in North Africa and the Middle East.

=== Taiwan ===
Traditional Taiwanese Han culture is patrilineal, with some considering married daughters as "spilled water"; belonging to another lineage. Parents rely on their son and their sons' wife to support them when aged and eventually pass down the family line.

The sex ratio at birth in Taiwan in the 1960s and 1970s averaged 106 boys per 100 girls.

Legalized abortion, low fertility and the availability of sex screening, paired with the underlying son preference of Chinese culture, drives the incentive for sex-selective abortions. Abortion in Taiwan was legalized in 1985, at around the time fertility dropped below the self-sustaining replacement level (the total fertility rate was 2.4 in 1981 and dropped to 1.68 in 1986) and ultrasound sex screening became widespread.

The sex ratio at birth in Taiwan rose from 106.2 boys per 100 girls in 1985, to 110.5 boys per 100 girls in 1991. The first wave of sex selective abortions weakened in the early 1990s, due to rumors of the surgeries harming the birthed males' health, which made the sex ratio at birth fall to 107-108 males per 100 females by the mid 1990s.

By the early 2000s, the sex ratio at birth in Taiwan saw renewed growth, with 107-108 boys per 100 girls in the mid-late 1990s to the all-time peak of 110.7 boys per 100 girls in 2004, due to lowering fertility rates and improving sex determination skills.

In 2010, the government of Taiwan placed a ban on abortions solely based on fetal sex, which came to effect on January 13, 2011. As a result of the ban, doctors can be fined or face professional discipline if they illegally reveal fetal sex for non-health reasons before the gestational limit has expired.

The government has also set up a hotline for people to report illegal sex-selective abortions.

The ban was effective, and in 2012 the sex ratio at birth had dropped to 107.4, and dropped further to a low of 106.9 in 2014.

=== China ===
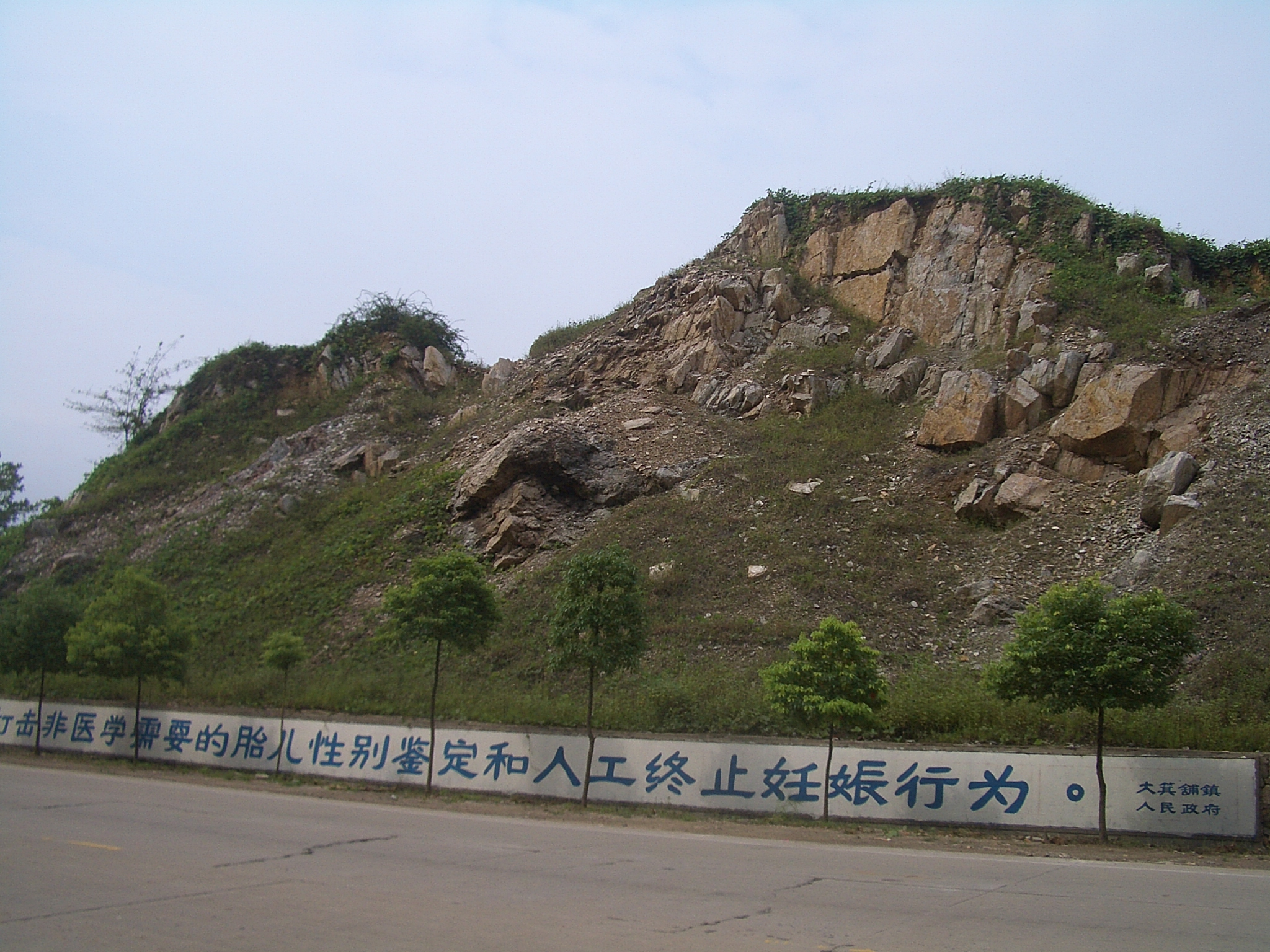
A roadside slogan calls motorists to crack down on medically unnecessary antenatal sex identification and sex-selective pregnancy termination practices. (Daye, Hubei, 2008)

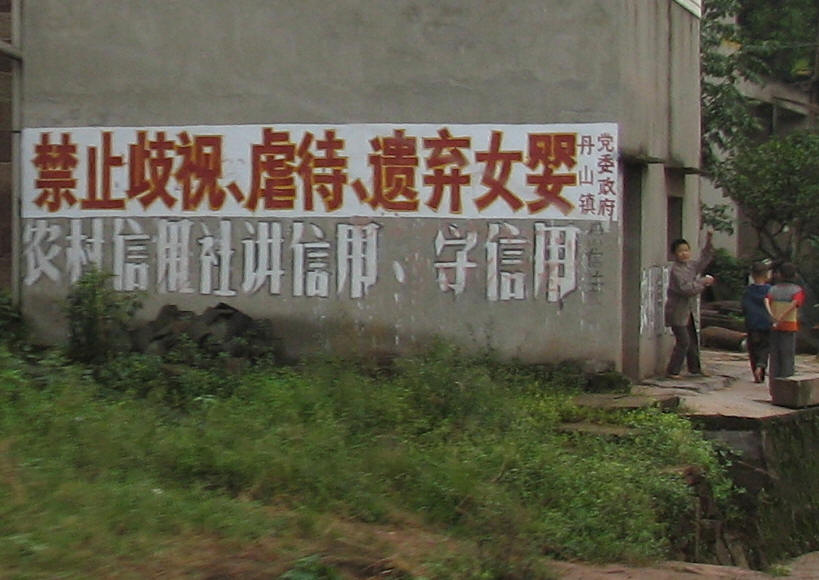
Roadside sign in Danshan Township, which reads "It is forbidden to discriminate against, abuse or abandon baby girls"

China, the most populous country in the world, has a serious problem with an unbalanced sex ratio population. A 2010 BBC article stated that the sex birth ratio was 119 boys born per 100 girls, which rose to 130 boys per 100 girls in some rural areas. The Chinese Academy of Social Sciences estimated that more than 24 million Chinese men of marrying age could find themselves without spouses by 2020. In 1979, China enacted the one-child policy, which, within the country's deeply patriarchal culture, resulted in an unbalanced birth sex ratio. The one child policy was enforced throughout the years, including through forced abortions and forced sterilizations, but gradually loosened until it was formally abolished in 2015.

When sex ratio began being studied in China in 1960, it was still within the normal range. However, it climbed to 111.9 by 1990 and to 118 by 2010 per its official census. Researchers believe that the causes of this sex ratio imbalance are increased female infant mortality, underreporting of female births and sex-selective abortion. According to Zeng et al. (1993), the most prominent cause is probably sex-selective abortion, but this is difficult to prove that in a country with little reliable birth data because of the hiding of "illegal" (under the One-Child Policy) births.

These illegal births have led to underreporting of female infants. Zeng et al., using a reverse survival method, estimate that underreporting keeps about 2.26% male births and 5.94% female births off the books. Adjusting for unreported illegal births, they conclude that the corrected Chinese sex ratio at birth for 1989 was 111 rather than 115. These national averages over time, mask the regional sex ratio data. For example, in 2005 Anhui, Jiangxi, Shaanxi, Hunan and Guangdong, had a sex ratio at birth of more than 130.

Traditional Chinese techniques have been used to determine sex for hundreds of years, primarily with unknown accuracy. It was not until ultrasonography became widely available in urban and rural China that sex was able to be determined scientifically. In 1986, the Ministry of Health posted the Notice on Forbidding Prenatal Sex Determination, but it was not widely followed. Three years later, the Ministry of Health outlawed the use of sex determination techniques, except for in diagnosing hereditary diseases. Individuals or clinics that violated the ban on prenatal determination at the request of the mother were subject to financial penalties, and the ban was repeatedly affirmed in the 1980s, early 1990s, and early 2000s. However, many people have personal connections to medical practitioners and strong son preference still dominates culture, leading to the widespread use of sex determination techniques.

Hardy, Gu, and Xie suggest sex-selective abortion is more prevalent in rural China because son preference is much stronger there. Urban areas of China, on average, are moving toward greater equality for both sexes, while rural China tends to follow more traditional views of gender. This is partially due to the belief that, while sons are always part of the family, daughters are only temporary, going to a new family when they marry. Additionally, if a woman's firstborn child is a son, her position in society moves up, while the same is not true of a firstborn daughter. Families in China are aware of the critical lack of female children and its implication on marriage prospects in the future; many parents are beginning to work extra when their sons are young so that they will be able to pay for a bride for them.

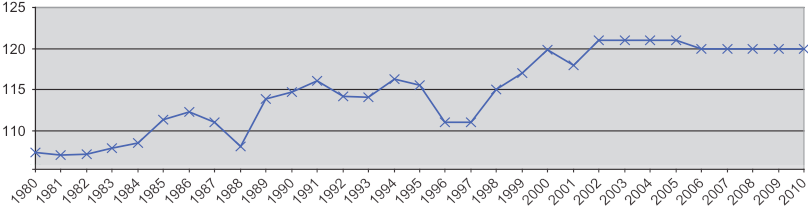
Birth sex ratios have dramatically changed in China since the implementation of the One-Child Policy.

In a 2005 study, Zhu, Lu, and Hesketh found that the highest sex ratio was for those ages 1–4, and two provinces, Tibet and Xinjiang, had sex ratios within normal limits. Two other provinces had a ratio over 140, four had ratios between 130 and 139, and seven had ratios between 120 and 129, each of which is significantly higher than the natural sex ratio.

The birth sex ratio in China, according to a 2012 news report, has decreased to 117 males born for every 100 females. The sex ratio peaked in 2004 at around 121, and had declined to around 112 in 2017. The ratio was forecast to drop below 112 by 2020 and 107 by 2030, according to the National Population Development Outline by the State Council.

In December 2016, researchers at the University of Kansas reported that the missing women might be largely a result of administrative under-reporting and that delayed registration of females, instead of abortion and infanticide practices. The finding questioned the earlier assumptions that rural Chinese villagers aborted their daughters on a massive scale and concluded that as many as 10 to 15 million missing women hadn't received proper birth registration since 1982. The reason for underreporting was attributed to families trying to avoid penalties when girls were born, and local government concealing the lack of enforcement from the central government. This implied that the sex disparity of the Chinese newborns was likely exaggerated significantly in previous analyses. Though the degree of data discrepancy, the challenge in relation to sex-ratio imbalance in China is still disputed among scholars.

=== India ===
A map of India's child sex ratio, 2011.

A research by Pew Research Center based on Union government data indicates foeticide of at least 9 million females in the years 2000–2019. The research found that 86.7% of these foeticides were by Hindus (80% of the population), followed by Sikhs (1.7% of the population) with 4.9%, and Muslims (14% of the population) with 6.6%. The research also indicated an overall decline in preference for sons in the time period.

India's 2001 census revealed a national 0–6 age child sex ratio of 108, which increased to 109 according to 2011 census (927 girls per 1000 boys and 919 girls per 1000 boys respectively, compared to expected normal ratio of 943 girls per 1000 boys). The national average masks the variations in regional numbers according to 2011 census—Haryana's ratio was 120, Punjab's ratio was 118, Jammu & Kashmir was 116, and Gujarat's ratio was 111. The 2011 Census found eastern states of India had birth sex ratios between 103 and 104, lower than normal. In contrast to decadal nationwide census data, small non-random sample surveys report higher child sex ratios in India.

The child sex ratio in India shows a regional pattern. India's 2011 census found that all eastern and southern states of India had a child sex ratio between 103 and 107, typically considered as the "natural ratio." The highest sex ratios were observed in India's northern and northwestern states – Haryana (120), Punjab (118) and Jammu & Kashmir (116). The western states of Maharashtra and Rajasthan 2011 census found a child sex ratio of 113, Gujarat at 112 and Uttar Pradesh at 111.

The Indian census data suggests there is a positive correlation between abnormal sex ratio and better socio-economic status and literacy. Urban India has higher child sex ratio than rural India according to 1991, 2001 and 2011 Census data, implying higher prevalence of sex selective abortion in urban India. Similarly, child sex ratio greater than 115 boys per 100 girls is found in regions where the predominant majority is Hindu, Muslim, Sikh or Christian; furthermore "normal" child sex ratio of 104 to 106 boys per 100 girls are also found in regions where the predominant majority is Hindu, Muslim, Sikh or Christian. These data contradict any hypotheses that may suggest that sex selection is an archaic practice which takes place among uneducated, poor sections or particular religion of the Indian society.

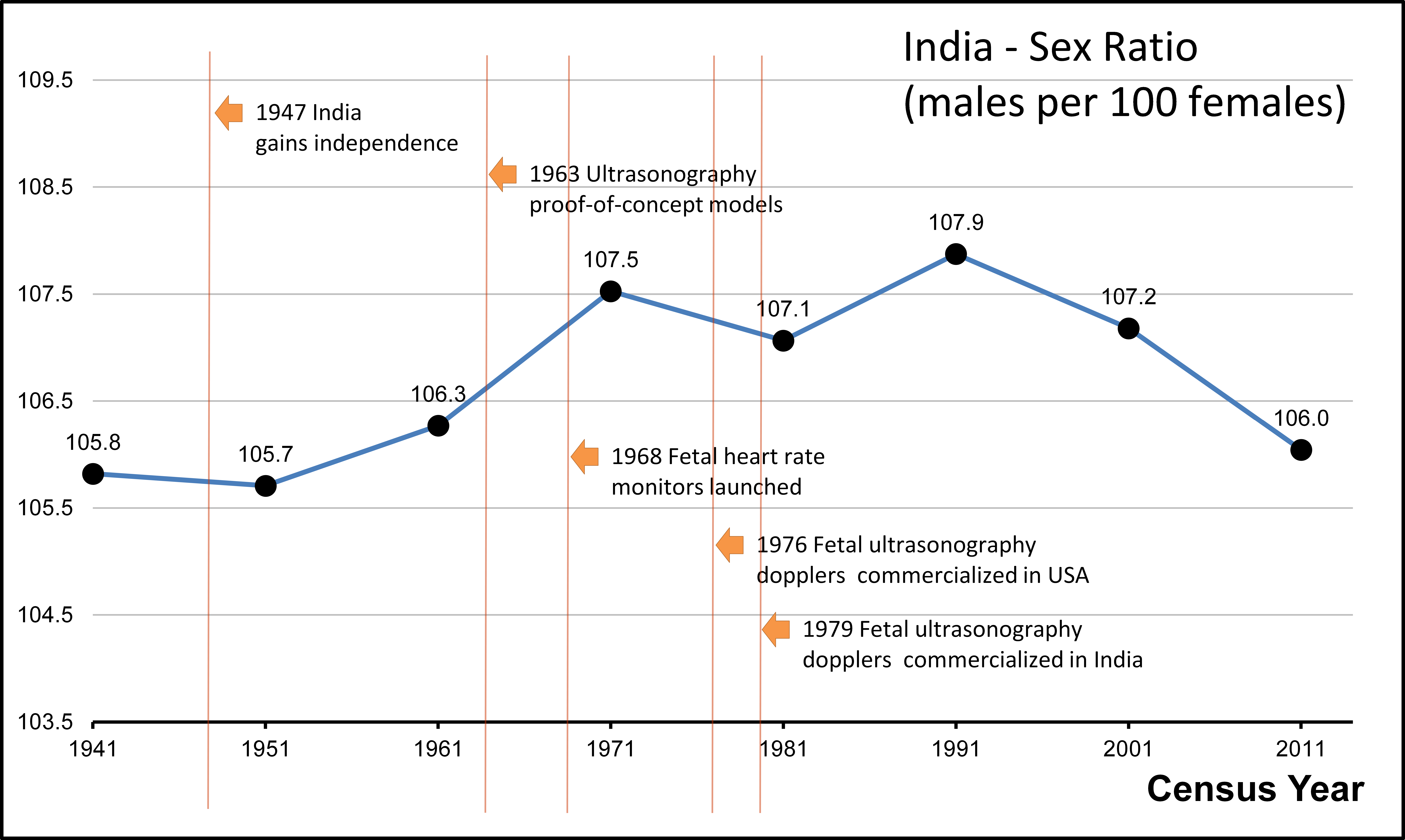
The male to female sex ratio for India, based on its official census data from 1941 through to 2011. The data suggests the existence of high sex ratios before and after the arrival of ultrasound-based prenatal care and sex screening technologies in India.

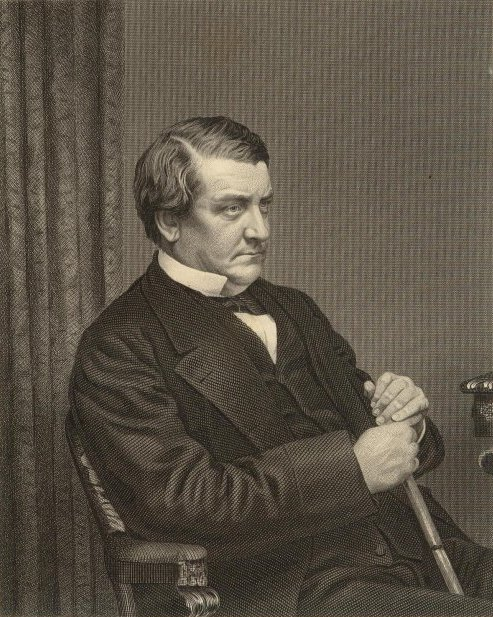
Richard Bourke, 6th Earl of Mayo, who was Governor-General of India at the time of the Female Infanticide Prevention Act, 1870.

Rutherford and Roy, in their 2003 paper, suggest that techniques for determining sex prenatally that were pioneered in the 1970s, gained popularity in India. These techniques, claim Rutherford and Roy, became broadly available in 17 of 29 Indian states by the early 2000s. Such prenatal sex determination techniques, claim Sudha and Rajan in a 1999 report, where available, favored male births.

Arnold, Kishor, and Roy, in their 2002 paper, too hypothesize that modern fetal sex screening techniques have skewed child sex ratios in India. Ganatra et al., in their 2000 paper, use a small survey sample to estimate that 1/6 of reported abortions followed a sex determination test.

The Indian government and various advocacy groups have continued the debate and discussion about ways to prevent sex selection. The immorality of prenatal sex selection has been questioned, with some arguments in favor of prenatal discrimination as more humane than postnatal discrimination by a family that does not want a female child. Others question whether the morality of sex selective abortion is any different over morality of abortion when there is no risk to the mother nor to the fetus, and abortion is used as a means to end an unwanted pregnancy.

India passed its first abortion-related law, the so-called Medical Termination of Pregnancy Act of 1971, making abortion legal in most states, but specified legally acceptable reasons for abortion such as medical risk to mother and rape. The law also established physicians who can legally provide the procedure and the facilities where abortions can be performed, but did not anticipate sex selective abortion based on technology advances.

With increasing availability of sex screening technologies in India through the 1980s in urban India, and claims of its misuse, the Government of India passed the Pre-natal Diagnostic Techniques Act (PNDT) in 1994. This law was further amended into the Pre-Conception and Pre-natal Diagnostic Techniques (Regulation and Prevention of Misuse) (PCPNDT) Act in 2004 to deter and punish prenatal sex screening and sex selective abortion. The impact of the law and its enforcement is unclear. However, research shows that there was about a 0.7%-1% increase in female births after the PNDT Act was passed in 1994. Unfortunately, this data was not significant. United Nations Population Fund and India's National Human Rights Commission, in 2009, asked the Government of India to assess the impact of the law. The Public Health Foundation of India, an activist NGO in its 2010 report, claimed a lack of awareness about the Act in parts of India, inactive role of the Appropriate Authorities, ambiguity among some clinics that offer prenatal care services, and the role of a few medical practitioners in disregarding the law. At the start of passing this act, women were still able to travel across borders to continue having sex-selective abortions. This was until the national PNDT was passed in 1996.

The Ministry of Health and Family Welfare of India has targeted education and media advertisements to reach clinics and medical professionals to increase awareness. The Indian Medical Association has undertaken efforts to prevent prenatal sex selection by giving its members Beti Bachao (save the daughter) badges during its meetings and conferences.

In November 2007, MacPherson estimated that 100,000 abortions every year continue to be performed in India solely because the fetus is female. Women may further be subject to violence for birthing daughters over sons. In 2016, Anu Bansal was murdered by her husband after giving birth to another daughter. She was burned to death.

=== Pakistan ===
Pakistan has a tradition of sex selection. Similarly with India, the tradition of dowry plays role.

For Pakistan, the United Nations Population Fund, in its 2012 report estimates the Pakistan birth sex ratio to be 110. In the urban regions, particularly its densely populated region of Punjab, report a sex ratio above 112 (less than 900 females per 1000 males). Hudson and Den Boer estimate the resulting deficit to be about 6 million missing girls in Pakistan than what would normally be expected.

In 2017, two Pakistani organisations discovered large cases of infanticide in Pakistani cities. This was led by the Edhi Foundation and Chhipa Welfare Foundation. The infanticide victims were almost all female infants. The reason given by the local authorities were poverty and local customs, where boys are preferred to girls. However, the large discovery in Karachi shows that many of the female infants were killed because of the local clerics, who ordered that out-of-wedlock babies should be disregarded. This is due to the fact that fornication is a major sin in Islam, although it is also haram (forbidden) to kill an innocent soul, which babies and children fall under. In fact, Muhammad explicitly banned the killing of female infants, as it was a custom in Pre-Islamic Arabia.

From January 2017 to April 2018, Edhi Center foundation and Chhipa Welfare organisation have found 345 such new born babies dumped in garbage in Karachi only and 99 percent of them were girls.

"We have been dealing with such cases for years and there are a few such incidents which shook our souls as much. It left us wondering whether our society is heading back to primitive age," Anwar Kazmi, a senior manager in Edhi Foundation Karachi, told The News.

Edhi Foundation has found 355 such dead infants from the garbage dumps across the country in 2017; 99 percent of them were identified girls. And Karachi has topped in this notorious ranking with 180 cases in 2017. As many as 72 dead girls have been buried in the first four months of this year by Edhi Foundation alone in the metropolitan city. The given data is just tip of the iceberg as Edhi foundation maintains the data of those cities where it provides services.

=== South Korea ===
Sex-selective abortion gained popularity in the mid-1980s to early 1990s in South Korea, where selective female abortions were commonplace as male children were preferred. Historically, much of Korea's values and traditions were based on Confucianism that dictated the patriarchal system, motivating the heavy preference for sons. Additionally, even though the abortion ban existed, the combination of son preference and availability of sex-selective technology led to an increasing number of sex-selective abortions and boys born. As a result, South Korea experienced drastically high sex ratios around the mid-1980s to early 1990s. However, in recent years, with the changes in family policies and modernization, attitudes towards son preference have changed, normalizing the sex ratio and lowering the number of sex-selective abortions. With that being said, there has been no explicit data on the number of induced sex selective abortions reportedly performed due to the abortion ban and controversy surrounding the topic. Therefore, scholars have been continuously analyzing and generating connections among sex-selection, abortion policies, gender discrimination, and other cultural factors.

=== Other Asian countries ===
Other countries with large populations but high sex ratios include Vietnam. The United Nations Population Fund, in its 2012 report, claims the birth sex ratio of Vietnam at 111 with its densely populated Red River Delta region at 116.

Sex-selective abortion is reported to be common in South Korea too, but its incidence has declined in recent years. As of 2015, South Korea's sex ratio at birth was 1.07 male/female. In 2015, Hong Kong had a sex ratio at birth of 1.12 male/female. A 2001 study on births in the late 1990s concluded that "sex selection or sex-selective abortion might be practiced among Hong Kong Chinese women".

Recently, a rise in the sex ratio at birth has been noted in some parts of Nepal, most notably in the Kathmandu Valley, but also in districts such as Kaski. High sex ratios at birth are most notable amongst richer, more educated sections of the population in urban areas.

=== Caucasus ===
Topography of the Caucasus, a region at the border of Europe and Asia, situated between the Black and the Caspian seas

The Caucasus has been named a "male-dominated region", and as families have become smaller in recent years, the pressures to have sons has increased. Before the dissolution of the Soviet Union in the early 1990s, the birth sex ratio in Caucasus countries such as Azerbaijan, Armenia and Georgia was in the 105 to 108 range. After the collapse, the birth sex ratios sharply climbed and have remained high for the last 20 years. Armenia, Georgia, and Azerbaijan have seen strongly imbalanced birth sex ratios in the first decade of the 21st century. In Georgia, the birth sex ratio for the years 2005–2009 was cited by The Economist to be about 120, a trend The Economist claims suggests that the practice of sex-selective abortion in the Caucasus has been similar to those in East Asia and South Asia in recent decades.

According to an article in The Economist the sex ratio in Armenia is seen to be a function of birth order. The article claimed that among first born children, there are 138 boys for every 100 girls. Overall, the birth sex ratio in Armenia exceeded 115 in some years, far higher than India's which was cited at 108. While these high birth sex ratios suggest sex-selective abortion, there is no direct evidence of observed large-scale sex-selective abortions in Caucasus.

According to latest CIA data, the 2017 sex ratio in the region is 112 for Armenia, 109 for Azerbaijan, and 107 for Georgia.

=== Southeast Europe ===
An imbalanced birth sex ratio has been present in the 21st century in the Western Balkans, in countries such as Albania, Macedonia, Kosovo and Montenegro. Scholars claim this suggests that sex-selective abortions are common in southeast Europe. As of 2017, according to CIA estimates, Albania's birth sex ratio is 109. According to Eurostat and birth record data over 2008–11, the birth sex ratios of Albania and Montenegro for that period were 112 and 110 respectively. In recent years, Montenegrin health authorities have expressed concern with regard to the significant imbalance between the number of male and female births. However the data from CIA in 2017 cites the birth ratio for Montenegro within the normal range, at 106. In recent years, the birth registration data for Macedonia and Kosovo indicate unbalanced birth sex ratios, including a birth rate in 2010 of 112 for Kosovo As 2017, CIA cited both Macedonia and Kosovo at 108.

=== United States ===
As in other countries, sex-selective abortion is difficult to track in the United States because of lack of data.

While the vast majority of parents in the United States do not practice sex-selective abortion, there is certainly a trend toward male preference. According to a 2011 Gallup poll, if they were only allowed to have one child, 40% of respondents said they would prefer a boy, while only 28% preferred a girl. When told about prenatal sex selection techniques such as sperm sorting and in-vitro-fertilization embryo selection, 40% of Americans surveyed thought that picking embryos by sex was an acceptable manifestation of reproductive rights. These selection techniques are available at about half of American fertility clinics, as of 2006. However, other studies show a larger preference for females. According to the Parliamentary Office of Science and Technology, 80% of American couples who wanted to get gender selection wanted girls over boys.

A study of the 2000 United States Census suggests possible male bias in families of Chinese, Korean and Indian immigrants, which was getting increasingly stronger in families where the first one or two children were female. In those families where the first two children were girls, the birth-sex ratio of the third child was 1.51:1.

Because of this movement toward sex preference and selection, many bans on sex-selective abortion have been proposed at the state and federal level. In 2010 and 2011, sex-selective abortions were banned in Oklahoma and Arizona, respectively. Legislators in Georgia, West Virginia, Michigan, Minnesota, New Jersey, and New York have also tried to pass acts banning the procedure.

== See also ==
- Abortion debate
- Child abandonment
- Fetal rights
- Feticide
- Gendercide
- Gender role
- Female foeticide in India
- Genetics and abortion
- Infanticide
- Missing women of Asia
- Missing women of China
- Psychohistorical views on infanticide
- Selective reduction
- Sex selection
