= Born alive laws in the United States =

Fetal rights laws in US

Fetal homicide laws, also known as born alive laws, in the United States Homicide or murder Other crime against fetus Depends on age of fetus Assaulting mother No law on feticide

Born alive laws in the United States are fetal rights laws that extend various criminal laws, such as homicide and assault, to cover unlawful death or other harm done to a fetus in utero or to an infant that has been delivered. The basis for such laws stems from advances in medical science and social perception, which allow a fetus to be seen and medically treated as an individual in the womb and perceived socially as a person, for some or all of the pregnancy.

Such laws overturn the common law legal principle that until physically born, a fetus or unborn child does not have independent legal existence and therefore cannot be the victim of such crimes. They often provide for transferred intent, sometimes called "transferred malice", so that an unlawful act which happens to affect a pregnant woman and thus harm her fetus can be charged as a crime with the fetus as a victim, in addition to crimes against any other people.

== History of born alive law ==
=== Common law ===
The born alive rule was originally a principle at common law in England that was carried to the United States and other former colonies of the British Empire. First formulated by William Staunford, it was later set down by Edward Coke in his Institutes of the Laws of England: "If a woman be quick with childe, and by a potion or otherwise killeth it in her wombe, or if a man beat her, whereby the child dyeth in her body, and she is delivered of a dead childe, this is great misprision, and no murder; but if he childe be born alive and dyeth of the potion, battery, or other cause, this is murder; for in law it is accounted a reasonable creature, in rerum natura, when it is born alive."

The phrase "a reasonable creature, in rerum natura" as a whole is usually translated as "a life in being", i.e. where the umbilical cord has been severed and the baby has a life independently of the mother. "Reasonable" here is used as in the 16th century, meaning "something that may reasonably be considered [a living creature]". In English law this meant that until born, the fetus was not accounted a person under criminal law, nor a separate person from its mother, and could not have the capacity to be the subject of an actus reus ('wrongful act') – a prerequisite for a criminal offense in the absence of any statute to the contrary.

=== Subsequent developments ===
In the 19th century, some began to argue for legal recognition of the moment of conception as the beginning of a human being, basing their argument on growing awareness of the processes of pregnancy and fetal development. They succeeded in drafting laws which criminalized abortion in all forms and made it punishable in secular courts. Advances in the state of the art in medical science, including medical knowledge related to the viability of the fetus, and the ease with which the fetus can be observed in the womb as a living being, treated clinically as a human being, and (by certain stages) demonstrate neural and other processes considered as human, have led a number of jurisdictions – in particular in the United States – to supplant or abolish this common law principle.

Changes to the law proceed piecemeal, from case to case and from statute to statute, rather than wholesale. One such landmark case with respect to the rule was Commonwealth vs. Cass, in the Commonwealth of Massachusetts, where the court held that the stillbirth of an eight-month-old fetus, whose mother had been injured by a motorist, constituted vehicular homicide. By a majority decision, the Massachusetts Supreme Judicial Court held that a viable fetus constituted a "person" for the purposes of vehicular homicide law. In the opinion of the justices, "We think that the better rule is that infliction of perinatal injuries resulting in the death of a viable fetus, before or after it is born, is homicide."

Several courts have held that it is not their function to revise statute law by abolishing the born alive rule, and have stated that such changes in the law should come from the legislature. In 1970 in Keeler v. Superior Court of Amador County, the California Supreme Court dismissed a murder indictment against a man who had caused the stillbirth of the child of his estranged pregnant wife, stating that "the courts cannot go so far as to create an offense by enlarging a statute, by inserting or deleting words, or by giving the terms used false or unusual meanings ... Whether to extend liability for murder in California is a determination solely within the province of the Legislature."

Several legislatures passed laws to explicitly include deaths and injuries to fetuses in utero. The general policy has been that an attacker who causes the stillbirth of a fetus should be punished for the destruction of that fetus in the same way as an attacker who attacks a person and causes their death. Some legislatures have simply expanded their existing offences to explicitly include fetuses in utero. Others have created wholly new, and separate, offences.

== Federal laws ==
The Born-Alive Infants Protection Act ("BAIPA" Pub. L. 107–207 (text) (PDF), 116 Stat. 926, enacted August 5, 2002, 1 U.S.C. § 8) extends legal protection to an infant born alive after a failed attempt at induced abortion. It passed into law on August 5, 2002. The law defines a "born alive" infant as the complete expulsion of an infant at any stage of development that has a heartbeat, pulsation of the umbilical cord, breath, or voluntary muscle movement, regardless of circumstances of birth or severance of the umbilical cord, and provides rights for such infants. The Born-Alive Abortion Survivors Protection Act is a proposed law that would provide criminal penalties to any practitioner who denies a born-alive infant medical care.

The Unborn Victims of Violence Act (Public Law 108-212) recognizes a "child in utero" as a legal victim, if he or she is injured or killed during the commission of any of over 60 listed federal crimes of violence. The law defines "child in utero" as "a member of the species Homo sapiens, at any stage of development, who is carried in the womb". It applies only to certain offenses over which the United States government has jurisdiction, including certain crimes committed on federal properties, against certain federal officials and employees, and by members of the military, as well as certain crimes (including some acts of terrorism) which count as federal offenses even if outside the United States. The act explicitly provides that it may not "be construed to permit the prosecution" of any person in relation to consensual abortion, medical treatment of a mother or her fetus, or any woman with regard to her own fetus. It passed into law on April 1, 2004, and is codified under two sections of the United States Code: Title 18, Chapter 1 (Crimes), §1841 (18 USC 1841), and the Uniform Code of Military Justice: Title 10, Chapter 22 §919a (Article 119a). The law was both hailed and vilified by legal observers who interpreted the measure as a step toward granting legal personhood to human fetuses.

== List of laws by state ==
=== Overview ===
Born-alive legislation on abortion by state
State	Law	Status	Summary
Arizona	SB 1367 (2017)	Active	In 2017, Arizona enacted SB 1367, requiring physicians to file a report on and use all available medical means to preserve the life of any infant born alive after an abortion. The bill was signed into law by Gov. Doug Ducey.
Arkansas	Ark. Code § 20-16-604	Active	Arkansas law requires providers to file a report to the state if an infant is born alive during or after an abortion attempt. It also requires providers to "take all medically appropriate and reasonable steps to preserve the life and health" of the born-alive infant.
Florida	HB 1129 (2013) – Infants Born Alive Act	Active	Florida's Infants Born Alive Act (2013) mandates that infants born alive during or after an abortion receive the same medical care as any newborn, be promptly transferred to a hospital, and have the incident reported to the state. Failure to provide care or report violations is a misdemeanor. The law was unanimously passed by the legislature and signed by Gov. Rick Scott in 2013.
Indiana	Ind. Code § 16-34-2-3	Active	Indiana law requires physicians to take all reasonable steps to preserve the life of any infant born alive after an abortion. Providers must also report such births to the state.
Kansas	HB 2313 (2023) – Born-Alive Infants Protection Act	Active	Kansas' Born-Alive Infants Protection Act (2023) requires medical professionals to provide life-saving care to any infant born alive after an abortion and transport the newborn to a hospital, with criminal penalties for failure to do so. Passed by the legislature in 2023; Gov. Laura Kelly vetoed the bill as "unnecessary," but the legislature overrode the veto, and it became law.
Kentucky	SB 9 (2021) – Born-Alive Infant Protection Act	Active	Kentucky's Born-Alive Infant Protection Act (2021) requires doctors to "provide life-saving care if a baby survives an abortion attempt", making it a felony for a physician to "refuse to care for an infant born alive". The bill passed the General Assembly with veto-proof majorities; Gov. Andy Beshear allowed it to become law without his signature in 2021.
Michigan	Act 687 (2002) – Born Alive Infant Protection Act	Active	Michigan's Born Alive Infant Protection Act (2002) defines any infant born alive at any stage of development as a legal person and mandates that health providers report and give immediate medical care to any infant born alive after an abortion. Michigan's law also requires emergency transfer to a hospital if an abortion outside a hospital yields a live birth. In 2023, Michigan amended certain definitions in this law, but the requirement to care for born-alive infants remains in effect.
Minnesota	Minn. Stat. § 145.423 (1976)	Repealed	Prior to 2023, Minnesota law stated that "all reasonable measures…shall be taken by responsible medical personnel to preserve the life and health of the born alive infant" after an abortion. In 2023, Gov. Tim Walz signed an update replacing "preserve the life and health" with a requirement to "care for the infant who is born alive".
Missouri	Mo. Rev. Stat. § 188.030 (2017)	Active	Missouri law requires a second physician to attend abortions at 20+ weeks for care of any potentially viable infant. Providers must give immediate care and hospital transfer to born-alive infants. As of 2025, these provisions remain in statute, and additional legislation is pending (e.g. HB 1119).
Montana	HB 625 (2023) – Born-Alive Infant Protection Act	Active	In 2023, the Montana Legislature passed (and Gov. Greg Gianforte signed) a law requiring that any infant born alive after an attempted abortion receive appropriate medical care and be transported to a hospital. This came just months after Montana voters rejected a ballot measure, the 2022 Montana Legislative Referendum 131, that would have imposed criminal penalties on providers for failing to care for a born-alive infant after abortion. The 2023 law carries reduced penalties (up to 5 years in prison, rather than 20) and allows "comfort care" if a newborn is unlikely to survive, addressing concerns raised during the failed referendum.
New York	New York Public Health Law § 4164	Repealed	New York's Reproductive Health Act (2019) removed previous state provisions (Public Health Law § 4164) that had required life-saving measures and legal protection for any infant born alive during an abortion. As a result, New York law no longer contains any specific "born-alive" statutes.
North Carolina	SB 20 (2023) – Care for Women, Children, and Families Act	Active	In 2019, North Carolina passed SB 359, the Born-Alive Abortion Survivors Protection Act, to require medical care for infants who survive abortion, with felony penalties for noncompliance. Gov. Roy Cooper vetoed the bill, and an override attempt failed. A similar bill in 2021 met the same fate. In 2023, however, the legislature overrode Cooper's veto of SB 20, a broader law on abortion that restricted most abortions after 12 weeks. The law, which is now in effect, has a provision that requires healthcare providers to offer the same level of care to any infant born alive after an abortion as to any newborn of the same gestational age, ensure immediate hospital transfer, and submit required reports.
Ohio	SB 157 (2021) – Born-Alive Reporting and Penalties Act	Active	Ohio's Born-Alive Reporting and Penalties Act (2021) requires that any infant born alive after an attempted abortion be given life-sustaining care and have the incident reported to the Ohio Department of Health. The law passed along party lines and was signed by Gov. Mike DeWine in December 2021.
Oklahoma	63 Okla. Stat. § 1-737.10 (2017)	Active	Oklahoma law requires physicians to provide care to preserve the life of an infant born alive after an abortion, and to report any such live birth to state authorities. Since 2022, abortion has been mostly banned in Okahoma.
Pennsylvania	18 Pa. Cons. Stat. § 3210–3211 (1989) – Abortion Control Act	Active	Pennsylvania's Abortion Control Act (1989), upheld in Planned Parenthood v. Casey, requires that for any abortion after fetal viability, a second physician must be present "in the same room" to take charge of the newborn. If the infant is born alive, that law requires that a second physician "shall take control of the child immediately after complete extraction from the mother and shall provide immediate medical care for the child, taking all reasonable steps necessary to preserve the child's life and health."
South Dakota	HB 1051 (2021) – Born-Alive Infants Protection Act	Active	South Dakota's Born-Alive Infants Protection Act (2021) mandates that any infant born alive after an abortion receive the same medical care as any other newborn. Penalties apply for failure to comply, and incidents must be reported to the state. The law was signed by Gov. Kristi Noem in February 2021.
Texas	HB 16 (2019) – Born-Alive Civil Cause of Action Act	Active	Texas' Born-Alive Civil Cause of Action Act (2019) requires providers to ensure that if a child is born alive, the physician "must exercise the same degree of professional skill, care, and diligence to preserve the life and health of the child" as would be required for any live-born infant. It also instituted a reporting requirement.
West Virginia	HB 4007 (2020) – Born-Alive Abortion Survivors Protection Act	Active	West Virginia's Born Alive Abortion Survivors Protection Act (2020) requires that medical providers use "reasonable medical judgment" to preserve the life of any infant born alive after an abortion, just as they would for any other newborn of similar gestational age. Violations subject the provider to discipline by the medical licensing board. It passed with bipartisan support and was signed by Gov. Jim Justice in March 2020.
Wisconsin	AB 179 (2019) / SB 16 (2021) / AB 63 (2023) / AB 382 (2025)	Failed	Since 2019, the Republican-controlled Wisconsin Legislature has repeatedly introduced Born-Alive Infant Protection bills—in 2019, 2021, 2023, and 2025—aiming to require life-saving care for infants who survive abortion and to criminalize failure to provide it. Gov. Tony Evers vetoed the measures in 2019, 2021, and 2023, calling them unnecessary since infanticide is already illegal. As of 2025, Wisconsin has no separate born-alive statute.

=== California ===
§187 of the California Penal Code was amended to redefine murder to include the unlawful killing of a fetus. The term "fetus" was not initially defined.

In People v. Smith (1976) the court qualified this as signifying a viable fetus, holding that until the capability for independent existence is attained by a fetus "there is only the expectancy and potentiality for human life". They reasoned that the U.S. Supreme Court had implicitly stated in various cases dealing with abortion, that destruction of a nonviable fetus did not constitute taking a human life. As homicide was the unlawful destruction of a human life, proof was required that the unlawful destruction of a human life had in fact occurred. Thus it was held that the defendant was guilty of abortion, but not homicide.

In People v. Davis (1994), the California Supreme Court examined this and concluded fetal viability was not essential for rights to exist. They reasoned that abortion cases such as Roe v. Wade discuss where to draw the line for legitimate state interest in situations where the interests of fetus and mother conflict. Such cases do not discuss, and do not preclude, a legitimate state interest in protecting the potentiality of human life perhaps arising at a different time in situations where the rights of the fetus do not have to be set against the rights of the mother.

=== Minnesota ===
Vehicular homicide, death to an unborn child, and injury to an unborn child are three separate offences, under the umbrella of criminal vehicular operation.
