= Born-Alive Abortion Survivors Protection Act =

Proposed United States legislation

- Long title: To amend title 18, United States Code, to prohibit a health-care practitioner from failing to exercise the proper degree of care in the case of a child who survives an abortion or attempted abortion.
- Announced in: the 119th United States Congress
- Number of co-sponsors: 163

Legislative history
- Introduced in the House of Representatives as H.R. 21 by Ann Wagner (R–MO) on January 3, 2025; Committee consideration by House Judiciary; Passed the House on January 24, 2024 (217-201-1)

The Born-Alive Abortion Survivors Protection Act is a proposed United States law that would penalize health-care practitioners who fail to provide care for an infant that is born-alive from an abortion attempt. It was introduced in the 114th, 115th, 116th, 117th, 118th, and 119th Congresses.

== Background ==
Abortion is a contentious political issue in the United States. The abortion-rights movement, which argues that a woman's right to privacy and bodily autonomy extends to the right to an abortion, is predominantly upheld by the Democratic Party. The anti-abortion movement, which argues that an embryo or fetus has rights that must be protected by law, is largely upheld by the Republican Party.

The anti-abortion movement has claimed that viable infants have been left to die following failed abortion procedures. On August 5, 2002, President George W. Bush signed into law the Born-Alive Infants Protection Act, which established that every infant who survives an abortion procedure is considered a person under federal law. However, this law did not establish explicit criminal penalties for failing to treat such infants, and the Born-Alive Abortion Survivors Protection Act has been introduced in every Congress since the 114th in attempts to remedy it.

Following the reversal of federal abortion rights in Dobbs v. Jackson Women's Health Organization, the anti-abortion movement has called for federal legislation restricting abortion. Dobbs has been blamed for Republican underperformance in the 2022 mid-term elections; so, the advancement of such legislation is considered to be politically risky for the Republican Party.

== Provisions ==
The bill requires that any infant born from an abortion attempt be given the same amount of care as any other infant born at same gestational age, such as in a pre-term birth. Failure for a health-care practitioner to do can be penalized with up to five years imprisonment under the bill. Violations of the law are required to be reported to a hospital or law enforcement. The bill also authorizes a right to civil action to the mother of which an infant had been neglected care.

Opponents of the bill have called its provisions unnecessary and misleading, with the criminal penalties having the potential to deter a doctor's best judgement.

== Legislative history ==
As of January 28, 2025

Congress	Short title	Bill number(s)	Date introduced	Sponsor(s)	# of cosponsors	Latest status
114th Congress	Born-Alive Abortion Survivors Protection Act	H.R. 3504	September 15, 2015	Rep. Trent Franks (R-AZ)	98	Referred to the House Judiciary Committee Passed the House of Representatives (248–177–1)
114th Congress	Born-Alive Abortion Survivors Protection Act	S. 2066	September 22, 2015	Sen. Ben Sasse (R-NE)	38	Referred to the Senate Judiciary Committee
115th Congress	Born-Alive Abortion Survivors Protection Act	H.R. 37	January 3, 2017	Rep. Trent Franks (R-AZ)	90	Referred to the House Judiciary Committee
115th Congress	Born-Alive Abortion Survivors Protection Act	S. 220	January 24, 2017	Sen. Ben Sasse (R-NE)	36	Referred to the Senate Judiciary Committee
116th Congress	Born-Alive Abortion Survivors Protection Act	H.R. 962	February 5, 2019	Rep. Ann Wagner (R-MO)	193	Referred to the House Judiciary Committee
116th Congress	Born-Alive Abortion Survivors Protection Act	S. 130	January 15, 2019	Sen. Ben Sasse (R-NE)	49	Referred to the Senate Judiciary Committee
117th Congress	Born-Alive Abortion Survivors Protection Act	H.R. 619	March 22, 2021	Rep. Ann Wagner (R-MO)	208	Referred to the House Judiciary Committee
117th Congress	Born-Alive Abortion Survivors Protection Act	S. 123	January 28, 2021	Sen. Ben Sasse (R-NE)	45	Referred to the Senate Judiciary Committee
118th Congress	Born-Alive Abortion Survivors Protection Act	H.R. 26	January 11, 2023	Rep. Ann Wagner (R-MO)	166	Referred to the House Judiciary Committee Passed the House of Representatives (220–210–1)
118th Congress	Born-Alive Abortion Survivors Protection Act	S. 204	February 1, 2023	Sen. John Thune (R-SD)	43	Referred to the Senate Judiciary Committee
119th Congress	Born-Alive Abortion Survivors Protection Act	H.R. 21	January 3, 2025	Rep. Ann Wagner (R-MO)	163	Referred to the House Judiciary Committee Passed the House of Representatives (217–204–1)
119th Congress	Born-Alive Abortion Survivors Protection Act	S. 2066	September 22, 2025	Sen. James Lankford (R-OK)	46	Referred to the Senate Judiciary Committee

== See also ==
- Born alive laws in the United States
- Abortion in the United States § Federal legislation
