= Shaun Bailey, Baron Bailey of Paddington =

British politician (born 1971)

The Right Honourable The Lord Bailey of Paddington AM
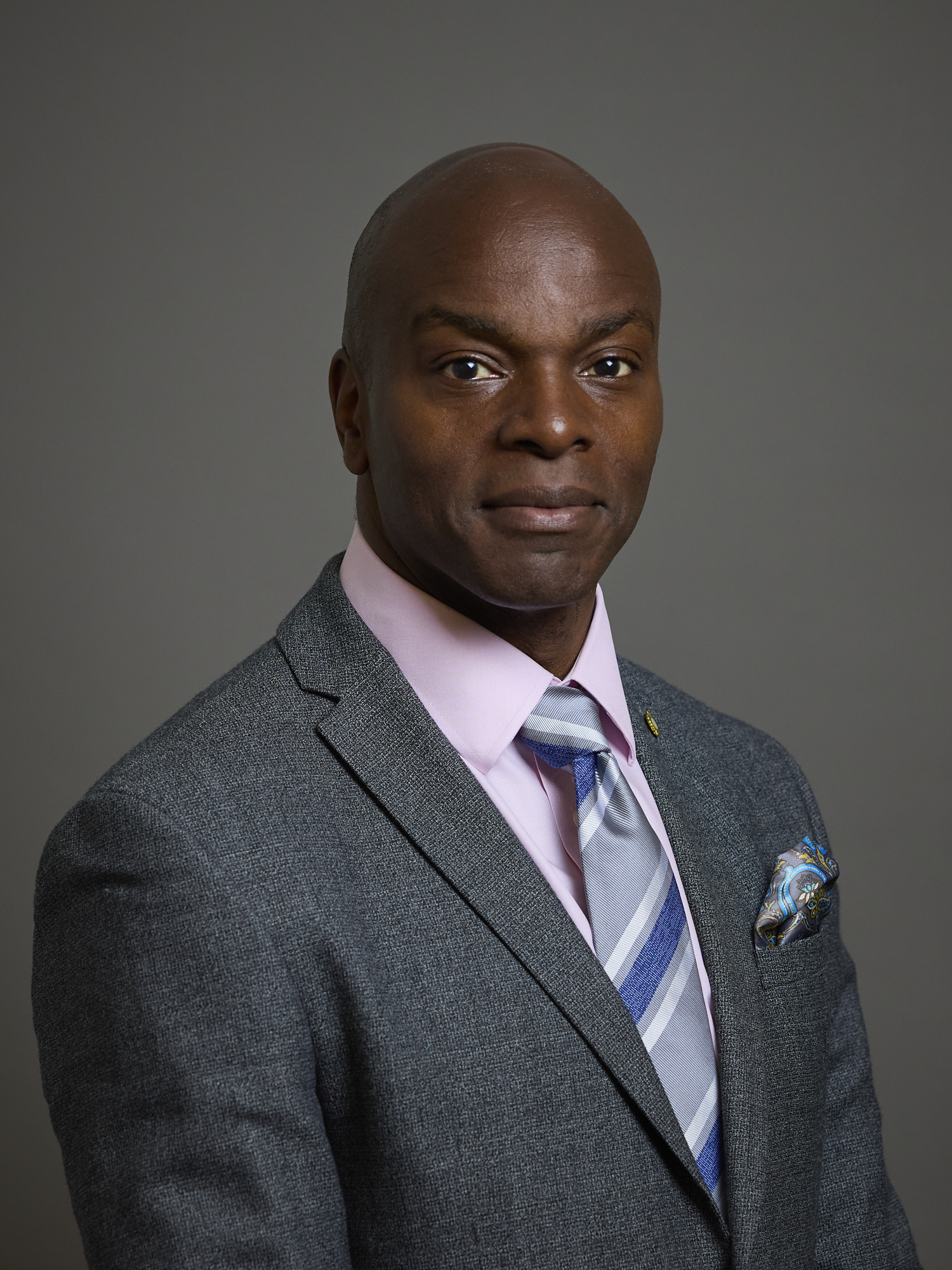
- Official portrait, 2025

Member of the House of Lords
- Lord Temporal
- Life peerage 10 July 2023

Member of the London Assembly as an additional member
- Incumbent
- Assumed office 6 May 2016

Personal details
- Born: Shaun Sharif Bailey; 30 May 1971 (age 55) North Kensington, London, England
- Party: Conservative
- Spouse: Ellie Bailey
- Children: 2
- Education: London South Bank University (BEng)
- Shaun Bailey's voice Bailey on why he became a member of the London Assembly; Recorded 21 September 2018

Shaun Sharif Bailey, Baron Bailey of Paddington (born 30 May 1971), is a British politician. A member of the Conservative Party, he has been a member of the London Assembly since 2016 and the House of Lords since July 2023.

Born in North Kensington to a British Jamaican family, Bailey earned a degree in computer-aided engineering from London South Bank University. In 2006, he co-founded a charity called MyGeneration; it ceased operations in 2012 due to financial problems. Bailey was a researcher for the Centre for Policy Studies and wrote several opinion pieces in British newspapers. He was appointed a special adviser on youth and crime to Prime Minister David Cameron from 2010 to 2013. He also stood unsuccessfully to be elected to the House of Commons as the Conservative candidate for Hammersmith in 2010 and Lewisham West and Penge in 2017.

In 2018, Bailey was selected as the Conservative candidate in the 2021 London mayoral election. He came second in the election, losing to Sadiq Khan in the second-preference count, having received 35 per cent of first-preference and 45 per cent of second-preference votes.

Amid the Partygate scandal, Bailey resigned from his position as chair of the London Assembly's police and crime committee after a photograph of him at a December 2021 gathering at the Conservative Campaign Headquarters emerged, attracting allegations that he had breached COVID-19 restrictions that were then in place in England. In November 2022, the Metropolitan Police said they were taking no action against Bailey for his attendance at the gathering, citing insufficient evidence. On 4 July 2023, the police announced that they would be re-opening their investigation into the gathering after new evidence emerged.

== Early life ==
Bailey was born on 30 May 1971 in North Kensington, London. He and his younger brother were raised by his mother and extended family in the absence of his father, who worked as a lorry driver. When Bailey was around 13 years of age, he got to know his father and his second family, and became close to his stepsisters and stepbrother. His grandfather came to the UK from Jamaica in 1947. Bailey has said his grandfather fought for Britain in the Second World War.

Bailey attended Henry Compton School in Fulham and left with five CSEs. When Bailey was 12 years old, his mother sent him to join the Army Cadet Force in White City. When he was about 19 years old, he became a Sergeant-Instructor and stayed in the Cadets for another 10 years. At about the age of 12 or 13, he began attending the Jubilee Sports Centre to take up gymnastics, and he became a member of Childs Hill Gymnastics Display team. After leaving secondary school, Bailey attended Paddington College, where he achieved two A-levels and a BTEC certificate.

Bailey was the subject of an episode of the BBC Radio 4 series The House I Grew Up In, in which he admitted he had been a burglar in his youth and said: "I had a particular group of friends who indulged in a burglary. I had done it with them". Reflecting on gang culture, Bailey commented: "The problem of having estates with names is that people become very territorial. You kind of defend your 'ends'. Because you don't want your locale to be seen as where the pussies live."

== Career before politics ==
Bailey graduated at the age of 27 with a 2:2 in computer aided engineering from London South Bank University. Previously, he worked as a Security guard at Wembley Stadium and the London Trocadero to fund his university tuition. He was unemployed for two years. Bailey said: "I did bad, bad jobs. I basically worked sweeping factories, delivering beer and security work". At least 12 members of his peer group spent time in prison.

In May 2006, Bailey co-founded MyGeneration, a charity addressing the social problems that affect struggling young people and their families. It was established shortly before Bailey was selected by the Conservative Party to stand in the recreated Hammersmith constituency. In 2010, The Times reported that Bailey was at the centre of allegations that his North Kensington-based charity showed £16,000 worth of spending "without any supporting records". Between 2008 and 2009, almost half of the charity's expenditure was on publicity and administration, not "direct charitable expenditure". Of the £116,000 "charitable expenditure", more than half was spent on travel and subsistence. The charity was closed in 2012 due to financial problems. The charity's services were taken over by other charities including Kids Company.

== Political career ==
=== Parliamentary candidate ===
On 29 March 2007, Bailey was selected at an open primary to be the Conservative candidate for the newly recreated parliamentary seat of Hammersmith in West London. His campaign focused on issues surrounding families and social responsibility. He failed to win the seat at the 2010 general election, achieving a swing of 0.5% from Labour which was two points below the average swing across London, and lost by 3,549 votes.

In the run-up to the 2015 general election, Bailey was unsuccessful in attempts to be chosen as the Conservative Party candidate for Kensington, Croydon South, and Uxbridge South and Ruislip. At the 2017 general election, Bailey contested Lewisham West and Penge, where he finished in second place with 12,249 votes. His share of the vote declined by 1.1 percentage points compared with 2015, against an average decrease of 1.7 percentage points for the Conservatives across London.

=== Researcher ===
Bailey was a Research Fellow at the Centre for Policy Studies, writing for the Centre and for various newspapers, including the Evening Standard, the Times, and The Independent.

=== Government adviser ===
In 2011, Bailey was appointed as one of David Cameron's "Ambassadors for the Big Society". In 2012, he became a special adviser to the Prime Minister David Cameron on youth and crime. Bailey was paid a salary of £60,000 as a special adviser. In 2013, he was moved to a part-time role in the Cabinet Office on a one-year contract and was paid substantially less. The Telegraph published claims he was pushed out of Downing Street by David Cameron's "clique of Old Etonian aides".

=== London Assembly ===
In October 2015, Bailey was selected as the third Conservative candidate on the London Assembly top-up list, after Kemi Badenoch and Andrew Boff. He was Deputy Leader of the Conservative Greater London Authority Group before being selected as the Conservatives' Mayoral candidate.

=== NHS Trust's Board Member ===
In 2018, Bailey joined Havering NHS Trust's board as part of a diversity scheme as a trainee.

=== House of Lords ===
Bailey was nominated by Boris Johnson for a life peerage in the 2022 Prime Minister's Resignation Honours. On 10 July, he was created Baron Bailey of Paddington, of Paddington in the City of Westminster, and was introduced to the House of Lords on 18 July. He sits in the Lords for the Conservative Party.

== 2021 London mayoral election ==
=== Campaign ===
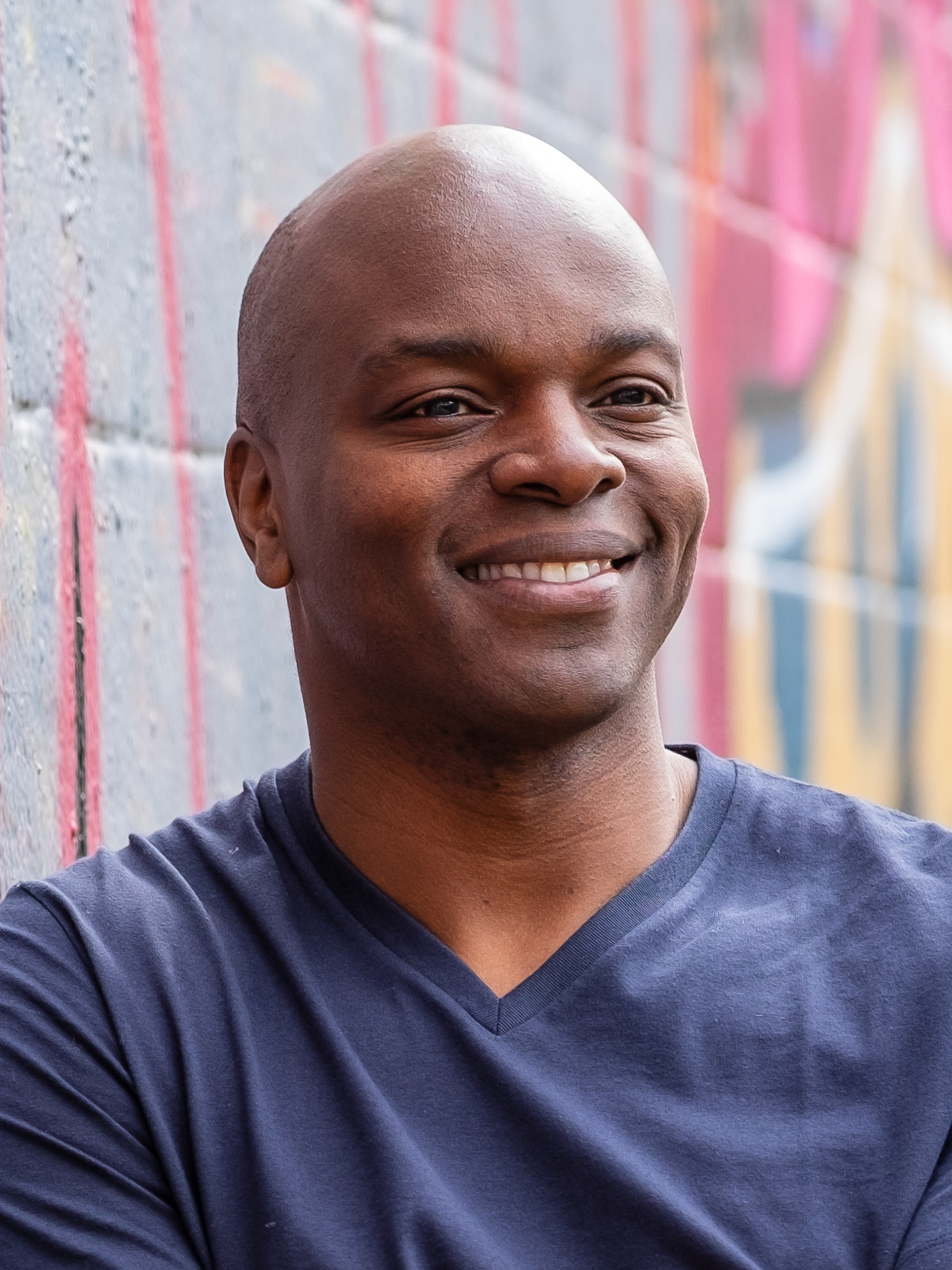
Bailey in 2019

In 2018, Bailey was selected as the Conservative candidate for the forthcoming London mayoral election (scheduled to be held in 2020 but later postponed until 2021). The Evening Standard newspaper endorsed Bailey for the Conservative candidacy, suggesting Bailey "had been both the embodiment and standard-bearer of Tory modernisation".

Bailey was subject to racism during the campaign on social media and in a letter posted to a Conservative party office.

Following his selection, Bailey was criticised for things he had written, said and shared on social media. He shared a tweet with an image with a caption describing Sadiq Khan, the incumbent mayor of London, as the "mad mullah of Londonistan". Bailey's spokesperson said he wouldn't have shared it if he had seen the caption.

In October 2018, Bailey was accused of Islamophobia and Hinduphobia over the contents of a pamphlet entitled No Man's Land, written for the Centre for Policy Studies in 2005. In it, Bailey said that celebrating Muslim and Hindu festivals "[robs] Britain of its community" and risked turning the country into a "crime riddled cesspool" as a result. He claimed that Indians "bring their culture, their country and any problems they might have, with them" but that this was not a problem within the black community "because we've shared a religion and in many cases a language". In the pamphlet, Bailey confused the Hindu religion and the Hindi language: "You don't know what to do. You bring your children to school and they learn far more about Diwali than Christmas. I speak to the people who are from Brent and they've been having Muslim and Hindi (sic) days off". James Cleverly, then the deputy chair of the Conservative Party, said that Bailey had been misunderstood and would not be sanctioned.

In June 2020, following poor polling figures against current-Mayor Sadiq Khan, the Financial Times reported that some senior Conservatives wished to replace Bailey with another candidate such as Sajid Javid. This was dismissed by ministers and other senior Tories, with Bailey criticising those in the Conservative Party who sought to replace him as the candidate, and stating that he had the personal backing of Prime Minister Boris Johnson.

In early March 2021, Bailey was accused of politicising the disappearance of a 33-year-old woman in Clapham, given that the police investigation was still ongoing. Liberal Democrat mayoral candidate Luisa Porritt called the comments "utterly grotesque", with Labour MPs calling his comments "shameless". In an interview, Minister for London Paul Scully defended Bailey's comments, with Bailey also stating that he didn't regret the tweet during an interview on LBC.

In mid March 2021, the Daily Mirror alleged that the Conservative Party had withdrawn campaign funding, noting the lack of funds raised by the campaign itself. Bailey's campaign denied the story, stating it was "fictional" and "hearsay".

=== Mayoral policies ===
Throughout 2020 and 2021, Bailey's mayoral campaign outlined several policies including:

- An increase in the size of the Metropolitan Police to 40,000 officers and the introduction of new 'stop and scan' technology that will use thermal imaging in knife crime hotspots.
- A reverse in the increase in the Congestion Charge to £15, and stopping the expansion of the Ultra Low Emission Zone.
- A taxpayer-owned housebuilding organisation controlled by the Mayor and funding 100,000 shared ownership homes to be sold for £100,000.
- A London Infrastructure Bank to fund Crossrail 2 and other infrastructure including Hammersmith Bridge and Tube upgrades.
- Plans to make every London bus electric by the end of a second term.
- To install CCTV on the Bakerloo, Central and Piccadilly London Underground lines in an effort to improve women's safety.
- To recruit 4,000 new youth workers and open 32 new youth centres, one for every London borough.

In August 2020, he announced he would encourage larger businesses in London to drug-test employees in an effort to reduce drug consumption and crime.

In September 2020, Bailey proposed that companies should be able to pay to rename tube lines and stations with commercial brand names. Bailey stated that funds so raised could be used to pay for under-18s and over-60s free travel.

In November 2020, Bailey pledged to fund 100,000 shared ownership 'millennial' homes to be sold at £100,000 each. These would be available for first time buyers under 40, who would be able to pay a deposit of just £5,000. In January 2021, Bailey was criticised for suggesting in an interview with Inside Housing that homeless people would be able to save for this £5,000 deposit to purchase an affordable home.

=== Results ===
Bailey received 893,051 first preference votes (35%) in the election. In a run-off against Sadiq Khan, he received a total of 977,601 votes (45%) when second preferences were included. Accordingly Sadiq Khan was re-elected Mayor of London although the result was tighter than earlier polls had predicted.

== Political views ==
Bailey has expressed concerns about liberalism, saying "the more liberal we have been, the more our communities have suffered". Bailey has accused the BBC's output as being biased and went on to suggest the BBC "sees itself as propagandist for liberal values", and that the licence fee should be split with other broadcasters.

Bailey supported leaving the European Union in the 2016 EU Referendum.

In 2006, Bailey said "by giving children condoms and the amount of sexual material they are exposed to you normalise sex and they feel it is their divine right to have it, when actually it is not", and added "that is one of the things that drives their self-esteem up or down and leads to crime". It was later clarified that Bailey had not tried to suggest that access to abortions and contraceptive services had directly led to crime, however early sexual activity was a contributing factor to increased crime.

Bailey has said that children are using abortion services as contraception and has favoured reducing the time limit from 24 weeks to 22 weeks.

In an article in The Daily Telegraph in 2006, Bailey claimed that single mothers deliberately become pregnant in order to gain benefits, saying that they "won't be too careful about not becoming parents. In some cases, they will deliberately become pregnant – as they know that if they do, they will get a flat". At an event at a Conservative party conference in 2008, he repeated these claims, saying that "Girls getting knocked up to get housing? It's a cottage industry where I come from."

Bailey has argued in support of allowing the police to have greater use of stop and search powers.

Bailey has stated his support for greater equality for black people. Speaking about the Black Lives Matter movement, Bailey commented that the movement "made everybody feel they are racist and actually very few people are." Prior to Black Lives Matter protests that occurred in London in 2020 taking place, he argued that they should be allowed to happen, because otherwise the tension behind such protests "will just spill out into the summer and be very tough for the police".

In 2021, Bailey opposed a review of statues and street names in London pledged by incumbent mayor Sadiq Khan, arguing that removing controversial statues does not change history. He instead argued that the review of place names and statues should be subject to citizen-led initiatives or that controversial statues should be placed in museums or have a plaque explaining the history behind the figure.

== Allegations and accusations ==
=== Alleged breaking of COVID-19 restrictions ===
In December 2021, The Times reported that Bailey, as the party's London mayoral candidate, attended a gathering on 14 December 2020 in the basement of the Conservatives' Westminster HQ, with four aides seconded from Conservative Campaign Headquarters. This was alleged to be in contravention of tier 2 coronavirus restrictions which were in place at the time. It was reported that Bailey was given a Lego set by a Conservative donor. Bailey was not disciplined, but his four aides were.

On 14 December 2021, The Daily Mirror published a photograph of the gathering, revealing that property developer Nick Candy was also present. The picture also showed guests wearing party hats and that alcoholic beverages and a buffet were available to guests. Following the release of the photograph, Bailey resigned from his position as chair of the London Assembly's police and crime committee.

On 11 January 2022, Bailey resigned as chair of a second London Assembly committee, the economy committee, in addition to his resignation from the police and crime committee in December.

On 11 November 2022, the police decided to take no action against Bailey, and all others in attendance at the gathering, citing insufficient evidence

On 18 June 2023, the Mirror released previously unseen video recordings of the above event. On 4 July 2023, the police announced that they would be re-opening their investigation into the gathering as a result of this new evidence.

=== Islamophobia and Hinduphobia accusations ===
Bailey has been accused of Islamophobia and Hinduphobia. In October 2018, it was reported that he had written a pamphlet, entitled No Man's Land, for the Centre for Policy Studies. In it, he said "You bring your children to school and they learn far more about [the Hindu festival of] Diwali than Christmas. I speak to the people who are from Brent and they've been having Muslim and Hindi (sic) days off. What it does is rob Britain of its community. Without our community we slip into a crime-riddled cesspool." He also claimed that South Asians "bring their culture, their country and any problems they might have, with them" and that this was not a problem within the black community "because we've shared a religion and in many cases a language". In the pamphlet, Bailey confused the Hindu religion with the Hindi language.

The Conservative Party Deputy Chairman, James Cleverly, defended Bailey and insisted that he was being misunderstood, and he implied that black boys were drifting into crime as a result of learning more about other faiths rather than learning about "their own Christian culture". However, the anti-racism Hope not Hate campaign group called Bailey's comments "grotesque".

=== Misogyny accusations ===
Bailey has been accused of misogyny after he suggested on the GB News television channel that it was not possible for a woman to be a serious political commentator while at the same time posting flattering photographs on social media. The subject of his comments, Carol Vorderman, had been previously critical of Bailey's elevation to the House of Lords despite his involvement in the 'Partygate' scandal.

== Personal life ==
Bailey grew up in social housing with his Jamaican mother, grandfather, grandmother, two aunts, and two uncles. His extended family lived on the same estate in Ladbroke Grove. Following selection as Conservative's PPC for Hammersmith in 2007, Bailey and his immediate family moved out of social housing and Bailey at the time said "the mice and damp got a bit much". He lives in a house owned jointly with a housing association. He and his wife Ellie have two children together.

Bailey attends an Anglican church.

Bailey has also made a regular appearance on GB News, particularly for the 9 pm programme Dan Wootton Tonight hosted by Dan Wootton.

== Publications ==
- Bailey S and Najjar N, 'Time for a Dose of Euro-Realism', Smart Government, 2015
- Bailey, Shaun (November 2005). "No Man's Land" (PDF). Centre for Policy Studies. Archived from the original (PDF) on 20 January 2016.

Orders of precedence in the United Kingdom
Preceded by The Lord Gascoigne	Gentlemen; Baron Bailey of Paddington	Followed by The Lord Kempsell
