= Foeticide =

Type of homicide

Foeticide (or feticide) is the act of killing a human fetus. The term may also encompass the killing of a human embryo. Definitions differ between legal and medical applications. In law, feticide (or fetal homicide) frequently refers to a criminal offense. In medicine, the term generally refers to a part of an abortion procedure in which a provider intentionally induces the death of the embryo or fetus to avoid the chance of an unintended live birth, or as a standalone procedure in the case of selective reduction.

== Etymology ==
Foeticide derives from two constituent Latin roots. Foetus, meaning child, is an alternate form of fetus coming from the writings of Isidorus, who preferred oe due to its association with foveo "I cherish" as opposed to feo "I beget". Foetus is compounded with the suffix -cide, from caedere, "to cut down, to kill." Also see homicide, genocide, infanticide, matricide, and regicide.

== As a crime ==
=== Laws in North America ===
==== Laws in the United States ====
Fetal homicide laws in the United States: Homicide or murder. Other crime against fetus. Depends on age of fetus. Assaulting mother. No law on feticide.

In the U.S., most crimes of violence are covered by state law, not federal law. 38 states currently recognize the unborn child (the term usually used) or fetus as a homicide victim, and 29 of those states apply this principle throughout the period of pre-natal development. These laws do not apply to legally induced abortions. Federal and state courts have consistently held that these laws do not contradict the U.S. Supreme Court's rulings on abortion.

In 2004, Congress enacted, and President Bush signed, the Unborn Victims of Violence Act, which recognizes the "child in utero" as a legal victim if he or she is injured or killed during the commission of any of the 68 existing federal crimes of violence. These crimes include some acts that are federal crimes no matter where they occur (e.g., certain acts of terrorism), crimes in federal jurisdictions, crimes within the military system, crimes involving certain federal officials, and other special cases. The law defines "child in utero" as "a member of the species Homo sapiens, at any stage of development, who is carried in the womb." This federal law (as well as many similar state laws, such as the one in California), does not require any proof that the person charged with the crime actually knew the woman was pregnant when the crime was committed.

Of the 38 states that recognize fetal homicide, approximately two-thirds apply the principle throughout the period of pre-natal development, while one-third establish protection at some later stage, which varies from state to state. For example, California treats the killing of a fetus as homicide, but does not treat the killing of an embryo (prior to approximately eight weeks) as homicide, by construction of the California Supreme Court. Some other states do not consider the killing of a fetus to be homicide until the fetus has reached quickening or viability.

In states where the overturning of Roe v. Wade has resulted in the complete illegalization of abortion except to preserve the life of the carrier, such laws may be used to prosecute any such procedure resulting in fetal demise.

Fetal homicide laws have also been used to prosecute women for recklessly causing stillbirths, such as in the cases of Rennie Gibbs, Bei Bei Shuai, and Purvi Patel. Gibbs was charged with murder in Mississippi in 2006 for having a stillborn daughter while addicted to cocaine. Gibbs is the first woman in Mississippi to be charged with murder relating to the loss of her unborn baby. The judge in that case ruled that the charges be dismissed. In 2011 Shuai was charged by Indiana authorities with murder and foeticide after her suicide attempt resulted in the death of the child she was pregnant with. Shuai's case was the first in the history of Indiana in which a woman was prosecuted for murder for a suicide attempt while pregnant. In 2013 Shuai pleaded guilty to a misdemeanor charge of criminal recklessness and was released, having been sentenced to time served. In 2015 Purvi Patel became the first woman in the United States to be charged, convicted, and sentenced on a foeticide charge. However, her conviction was later overturned, and she was resentenced to time served for a lesser charge.

==== Laws in Canada ====
Feticide is not considered a crime in Canada, as the Revised Statutes of Canada does not define a fetus as a person until it has either (1) taken a breath, (2) had independent circulation, or (3) had its umbilical cord severed. However, if the feticide occurs in the process of birth, it is a criminal offense.

=== Laws in Central America ===
==== Laws in Belize ====
In Belizean Law, Feticide is a crime, although the prosecution and exact legality of such a such an action is difficult to conclusively ascertain, as legal experts disagree on how the law, and its requirement for Mens rea should be applied.

==== Laws in Costa Rica ====
In Costa Rican law, feticide exists as a crime, but it does not stand equivalent to homicide, nor does it result in similar penalties.

==== Laws in El Salvador ====
In Salvadoran law, any act which results in the death of a fetus is heavily criminalized. This has resulted in numerous women being charged and convicted for miscarriages, as was the case with Evelyn Beatriz Hernandez Cruz, María Teres, and others.

==== Laws in Guatemala ====
In Guatemalan law, anyone who, during "acts of violence" causes on abortion "when the pregnant state of the victim is evident" has committed what the law calls an unintended abortion, and faces penalties up of up to three years imprisonment.

==== Laws in Honduras ====
In Honduran law, causing the death of a fetus where the mother is visibly pregnant is known legally as feticide.

==== Laws in Nicaragua ====
In Nicaraguan law, feticide is known legally as Reckless Abortion, and the law specifies that whoever causes "abortion through recklessness" is guilty of the offense and shall face six months to one year in prison.

=== Laws in the Caribbean ===
==== Laws in Bahamas ====
In Bahaman Law, feticide is only a crime if fetal demise was the intent of the act (for example, if a perpetrator performed an abortion, or assaulted a pregnant person with the explicit intent of inducing a miscarriage). In cases tried both recently and historically the murder of pregnant women, even when the women was obviously pregnant, resulted in no greater penalty for the destruction of the fetus.

==== Laws in Jamaica ====
In Jamaican law, feticide is not a crime. In recent history there have however been repeated calls for this to change.

==== Laws in Haiti ====
In Haitian law, feticide is a crime. Under Section 2, Article 262 of the Penal Code of Haiti, "Anyone who, by means of food, drink, medicine, violence or any other means, procures the abortion of a pregnant woman, whether she has consented to it or not, will be punished by imprisonment."

==== Laws in The Dominican Republic ====
In Dominican law, feticide is a crime. Under Article 317 of the Criminal Code of the Dominican Republic, "Whoever, by means of food, medicines, medicines, probes, treatments or in any other way, causes or directly cooperates to cause the abortion of a pregnant woman, even if she consents to it, shall be punished with the penalty of minor imprisonment."

==== Laws in St. Kitts and Nevis, Antigua and Barbuda, and Dominica ====
In the countries listed above, English Common Law remains the law of the land, and as such, feticide is prohibited by a combination of two acts, the first, the Offences Against the Person Act, makes feticide a crime, but only when the act that induced it was itself intended "to procure... (a) miscarriage", defining the act as an abortion. The second act on the subject, the Infant Life (Preservation) Act further outlines a separate crime, child destruction, which occurs when a person with "intent to destroy the life of a child capable of being born alive" takes an action which, "causes a child to die before it has an existence independent of its mother". The act goes on to specify that any fetus which has gestated for 28 weeks or more is to be considered capable of being born alive.

==== Laws in St. Lucia ====
In St. Lucia, feticide is only a crime if fetal demise was the intent of the act (for example, if a perpetrator performed an abortion, or assaulted a pregnant person with the explicit intent of inducing a miscarriage). The crime, known as "causing a termination of a pregnancy" occurs when someone causes the pregnant person to "be prematurely delivered of a child" but only if they also have "intent unlawfully to cause or hasten the death of the child"

==== Laws in St. Vincent and the Grenadines ====
In St. Vincent and the Grenadines, feticide is only a crime if fetal demise was the intent of the act (for example, if a perpetrator performed an abortion, or assaulted a pregnant person with the explicit intent of inducing a miscarriage). The crime, which is known simply as abortion occurs when someone "unlawfully administers to her (a pregnant person), or causes her to take, any poison or other noxious thing, or uses any force of any kind, or uses any other means whatsoever" but only if they also have "intent to procure the miscarriage of a woman".

==== Laws in Barbados ====
In Barbados, feticide is only a crime if fetal demise was the intent of the act (for example, if a perpetrator performed an abortion, or assaulted a pregnant person with the explicit intent of inducing a miscarriage) or, when the pregnant person "is about to be delivered of a child". The crime for intentionally inducing a miscarriage, which is known as "Administering drugs or using instruments to procure abortion" occurs when someone "with intent to procure the miscarriage of any woman,... unlawfully administers to her or causes to be taken by her any poison or other noxious thing or unlawfully uses any instrument or other means whatsoever". The crime for feticide where the pregnant person "is about to be delivered of a child", is defined as "Killing an unborn child" and occurs when a person "prevents the child from being born alive by any act or omission of such a nature that, if the child had been born alive and had then died, he would be deemed to have unlawfully killed the child"

==== Laws in Grenada ====
In Grenada, feticide is only a crime if fetal demise was the intent of the act (for example, if a perpetrator performed an abortion, or assaulted a pregnant person with the explicit intent of inducing a miscarriage). The crime is known simply as causing abortion, and is committed when someone takes an action "causing a woman to be prematurely delivered of a child, with intent unlawfully to cause or hasten the death of the child."

==== Laws in Trinidad and Tobago ====
In Trinidad and Tobago, feticide is only a crime if fetal demise was the intent of the act (for example, if a perpetrator performed an abortion, or assaulted a pregnant person with the explicit intent of inducing a miscarriage). The crime, which is known simply as abortion occurs when someone "unlawfully administers to her or causes to be taken by her any poison or other noxious thing, or unlawfully uses any instrument or other means whatsoever with the like intent" but only if they also have "intent to procure a miscarriage".

=== Laws in Europe ===
==== Laws in the United Kingdom ====
In English law, "child destruction" is the crime of killing a fetus "capable of being born alive", before it has "a separate existence". The Crimes Act 1958 defined "capable of being born alive" as 28 weeks' gestation, later reduced to 24 weeks. The 1990 Amendment to the Abortion Act 1967 means a medical practitioner cannot be guilty of the crime.

The charge of child destruction is rare. A woman who had an unsafe abortion while 7½ months pregnant was given a suspended sentence of 12 months in 2007; the Crown Prosecution Service was unaware of any similar conviction.

=== Laws in Asia ===
==== Laws in India ====
In Indian Law, feticide is considered a form of "culpable homicide". Section 316 of the Indian Penal Code defines the crime as "an act (that) cause(s) the death of a quick unborn child", but only applies when it occurs as an effect of another crime which would cause death, such as the murder of the mother.

In the case of sex-selective abortion, the Pre-Conception and Pre-Natal Diagnostic Techniques Act prohibits the act, although there is question as to the degree of enforcement, as the ratio of male to female live births continue to be misaligned with the international average.

== As a medical practice ==
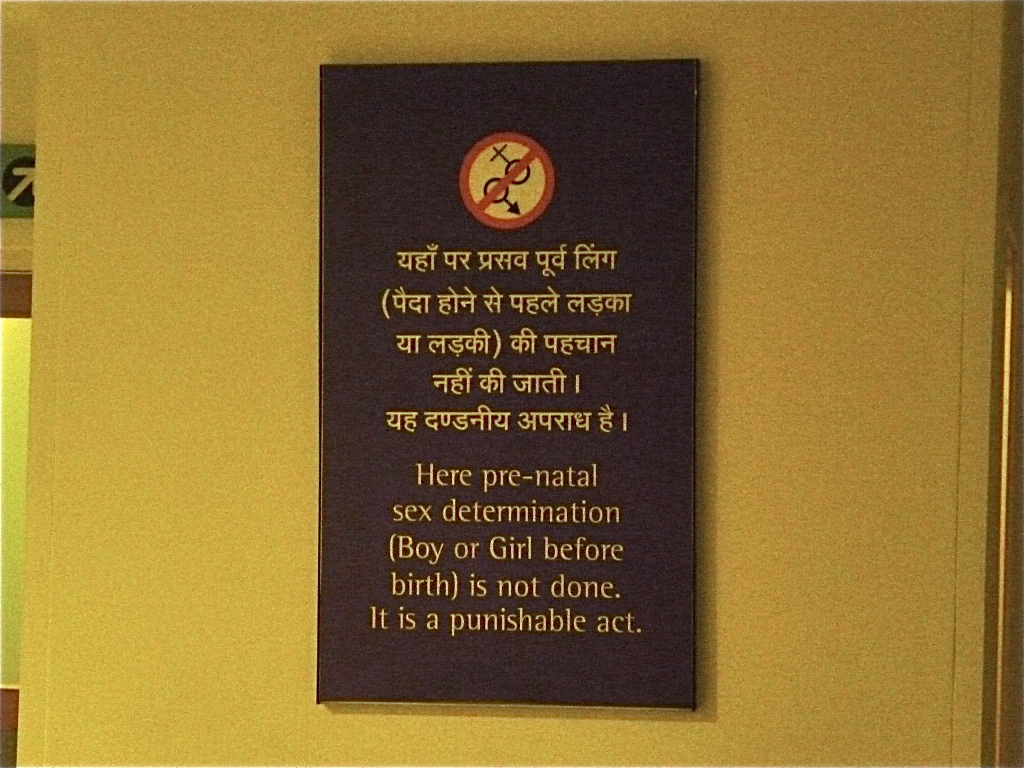
A sign in an Indian hospital stating that prenatal sex determination is a crime. The concern is that it will lead to female foeticide.

In medical use, the word "foeticide" is used simply to mean the induction of fetal demise, either as a precursor to a further abortion procedure, or as a primary abortive method during selective reduction due to fetal abnormality or multiples. The Royal College of Obstetricians and Gynaecologists recommends foeticide be performed "before medical abortion after 21 weeks and 6 days of gestation to ensure that there is no risk of a live birth". In abortions after 20 weeks, an injection of digoxin or potassium chloride into the fetal heart to stop the fetal heart can be used to achieve foeticide. In the United States, the Supreme Court has ruled that a legal ban on intact dilation and extraction procedures does not apply if foeticide is completed before surgery starts.

Historically, a multitude of methods both mechanical and pharmaceutical were used to induce fetal demise. These included intrafetal injection with meperidine and xylocaine, injection of lidocaine into the umbilical vain, intracardiac calcium gluconate or fibrin adhesive injection, umbilical occlusion by way of alcohol or enbucrilate gel injection, umbilical cord ligation, intraarterial coil placement, and cardiac puncture. These methods are rarely if ever used in modern practice, as both digoxin and potassium chloride have better, and more reliable outcomes.

Injecting potassium chloride into the heart of a fetus causes immediate asystole, but depending on the method used, digoxin may fail to induce fetal demise in some cases (up to 5% if injected into the fetus and up to a third if injected into the amniotic sac) even though it is the preferred drug in many clinics. Digoxin is preferred because it is technically difficult to inject KCl into the heart or umbilical cord.

The most common method of selective reduction—a procedure to reduce the number of fetuses in a multifetus pregnancy—is foeticide via a chemical injection into the selected fetus or fetuses. The reduction procedure is usually performed during the first trimester of pregnancy. It often follows detection of a congenital defect in the selected fetus or fetuses, but can also reduce the risks of carrying more than three fetuses to term.

== See also ==
- Abortion
- Born alive rule
- Female foeticide in India
- Fetal farming
- Infanticide
- Unborn Victims of Violence Act
