= Fetus Farming Prohibition Act =

2006 Act of Congress

The Fetus Farming Prohibition Act of 2006 (Pub. L. 109–242 (text) (PDF), 120 Stat. 570–571, enacted July 19, 2006) is an Act of the United States Congress that was sponsored by Republican Senators Rick Santorum, Sam Brownback, Richard Burr and Jeff Sessions, and signed by President George W. Bush. It is an amendment to the Public Health Service Act (42 U.S.C. §§ 201–300).

This act is a response to the idea that, at some point in the future, a technology might be developed that involved cells or tissues being removed from fetuses and used for fetal tissue implants or stem cell therapy. This proposal is controversial and has been termed "fetal farming" and "fetal organ harvesting". In the Act, this procedure was defined as the intentional creation and use of human fetal tissues or organs for scientific or medical purposes.

Some writers, including Robert P. George and Wesley J. Smith, have argued that embryonic-stem-cell research will inevitably lead to such procedures. Some supporters of embryonic stem cell have rejected this comparison. Other bioethicists and medical experts, including Jacob M. Appel and Sir Richard Gardner, have welcomed the possibility of using fetuses as a way to increase the supply of organs available for transplantation.

== See also ==
- Bioethics
- Organ trade
- Unborn Victims of Violence Act
