= History of abortion law debate =

In the earliest written sources, abortion is not considered as a general category of crime. Rather, specific kinds of abortion are prohibited, for various social and political reasons. In the earliest texts, it can be difficult to discern to what extent a particular religious injunction held force as secular law. In later texts, the rationale for abortion laws may be sought in a wide variety of fields including philosophy, religion, and jurisprudence. These rationales were not always included in the wording of the actual laws.

== Ancient sources ==
Many indigenous people have had access to herbal abortifacients, emmenagogues, and contraceptives, which had varying degrees of effectiveness. Some of these are mentioned in the earliest literature of the ancient world. However, citations for abortion related matters are scarce in the earliest written texts.

=== Social considerations ===
In the ancient world, discussions of offspring limitation, whether through contraception, abortion, or infanticide, were often linked with discussions about population control, the property rights of the patriarch, and the regulation of women engaged in unsanctioned sex. Cicero explains:

"I remember a case which occurred when I was in Asia: how a certain woman of Miletus, who had accepted a bribe from the alternative heirs and procured her own abortion by drugs, was condemned to death: and rightly, for she had cheated the father of his hopes, his name of continuity, his family of its support, his house of an heir, and the Republic of a citizen-to-be."

Families wealthy or poor may have had different reasons for practicing offspring limitation. The wealthy may have been concerned about breaking a large inheritance into numerous smaller portions for many heirs. A poor family may have been unable to feed a large number of children.

Aristotle held positions which align with twentieth-century eugenics arguments. In his view, abortion and infanticide were permissible when they accorded with the welfare of the state. He advocated mandatory exposure (to the elements) of children born with 'deformities,' and deemed abortion advisable when a couple had exceeded a quota of children, or when a couple had conceived passed their optimal childbearing age, as he believed that the eudaimonia of the individual was entwined with the welfare of the state. Plato held views similar to Aristotle's.

In Hindu scriptures, the matter is interpreted as reflecting a concern for the preservation of the male seed of the three "pure" castes, with the meaning of one word associated with abortion, bhrūṇahan, being "the killer of a learned Brahmin". Offspring limitation facilitated the financial stability of the influential families, preserving social order, and the males of these castes were required to perform important religious rituals. While caste mixing was severely condemned, abortion was not recommended, and the texts elaborated a complex set of rules for the social integration of people born of such unions.

Of some concern in all these discussions is the ability of the woman to conceal her pregnancy in the early stages, and to terminate an unwanted pregnancy through the use of herbs or, more rarely, crude surgery. Since menses may be interrupted by medical conditions other than pregnancy, a woman taking an emmenagogue could not necessarily be accused of attempting abortion, even if she did lose a fetus with the bringing on of stopped menses. Therefore, social control of childbirth, essential to the preservation of the social order, could only effectively be exercised after quickening. While the issue of child sacrifice may be included in such discussions, as part of a larger discussion of social attitudes toward children, it is a matter separate from abortion. In general, anything sacrificed to the gods is sacrificed precisely because it is valued by society and is therefore deemed an appropriate gift to the gods.

=== Religious and philosophic considerations ===
It was not until the Axial Age that religious text began to include explorations of more philosophic concepts, which often involved considerations of the nature of man, which in turn involved considerations of the nature of the soul. There were three main views that had various impacts on the question of abortion: a belief that this material world is accompanied by an incorporeal one, a belief that matter is an illusion and everything is incorporeal, and a belief that everything, including the soul is material in nature. The ancient Egyptians developed a complicated five part version of the nature of man, including both a soul (similar to a modern ghost) and a spirit (similar to the Buddhist stream of consciousness). The later Vedic literature, the Atharvaveda and Upanishads, held a doctrine of a World soul and an eternally reincarnating soul that enters the new physical body at conception. At times, these two kinds of soul were believed to be of the same substance. Many Greeks believed in panpsychism (that all things have an individual soul), while others believed that individuals emanate from a World soul, made of a different substance; and it is possible that Plato believed in elements of both.

Believers in transmigration of souls had varying opinions. Buddhism rejected the Hindu notion of an eternal soul atman, positing an ephemeral "stream of consciousness" that enters the physical body at conception. Judaism and Islam also taught various forms of pre-existence of a soul created by God, but believed in only one earthly incarnation, and that the soul enters the body at conception. Plato believed that the pre-existent soul enters the body at first breath.

The Stoics considered the fetus to be a part of the woman's body and held that the soul (the pneuma) enters the body when the newborn takes its first breath. Even then, the Stoics believed the child is neither rational being nor moral agent until 14 years of age. Aristotle proposed a theory of progressive ensoulment, stating that the fetus acquired first a vegetative soul, then an animal soul, then a rational soul, with the male providing the "rational soul" that animated the fetus at 40 days after conception. Opinion in the Islamic world differed as to whether the soul was "blown into" the fetus at 40 days or 120. Anglo-Saxon medical texts held that a fetus was "a man without a soul" until after the third month.

Generally, the question of the morality of abortion involved the question of the nature of the "animating principle", usually called the "rational soul", when the animating principle entered the body, whether it was an integral part of the bodily form and substance, whether it was pre-existent and subject to reincarnation or pre-existence, and whether a reincarnating soul might suffer as a result of the abortion. On these bases, some societies allowed infanticide of the newborn prior to its first breath (Stoic) or first nourishment (Germanic tribes), while some had differing laws for abortion depending on whether quickening had occurred.

=== Hippocratic Oath ===
The Hippocratic Oath is a code of professional conduct that can be compared with a set of similar edicts set down by Confucius. It is often cited as evidence of abortion attitudes in ancient Greece.

In Roe v. Wade, the US Supreme Court questioned the validity of this source, noting that "the Oath originated in a group representing only a small segment of Greek opinion and that it certainly was not accepted by all ancient physicians."

The clause referencing abortion has been questioned on a number of grounds. Authorship of this and other sections has been questioned as the language reflects Pythagorean influence; it has been suggested that he is specify that he would not give a pessary to a woman because that would abrogate the husband's prerogative in the matter, and is at odds with Hippocrates' own conduct when asked by a friend to provide an abortion for her slave girl whom the kinswoman had been using as a prostitute. He describes the kind of abortion he prescribed, and records no indication of his opinion of the slave's profession. Elsewhere, he gives instruction on how to cause an abortion through blood-letting.

== Legal opinions ==
The earliest texts almost uniformly preach respect for human life; but a reading of these passages must be balanced with passages meting out harsh and often horrific punishment for social transgressions of lower caste individuals against the upper castes. In Rome, the Twelve Tables were published only in response to "demands of the people".

The value of a human being varied according to rank and social circumstances. (Thus, even an upper class male might be considered a mere boy until well into his later years; with the term "boy" having a meaning similar to slave.) A slave woman might be punished by her master if he disapproved of her abortion, regardless of who the father was, because she destroyed his property. The monetary value of human beings is reflected in the value of fines paid for personal crimes, which varied in accordance both with the rank of the offender and of the victim. In Lev. 27:6, an infant of one month or less has no monetary value.

=== Religious law ===
There are no prohibitions of abortion in the Confucian texts, nor mention of it in the earliest Vedas. While there is no direct mention of abortion in the Bible, Exodus 21:22–24 states that a man who causes a woman to miscarry may be fined. The same passage states in contrast, that murder is punishable by death. Most Jewish writers allowed abortion to save the mother's life, and hesitated to impose civil laws against abortion, feeling that most women would ignore them. The Talmud deems the fetus to be part of its mother and has no "juridical personality". There is also no direct mention of abortion in the Qu'ran, although based on Qur'an 23:12–14, most jurists agree that abortion is acceptable up to 120 days after conception.

While the earliest Vedas have no mention of abortion, later scripture condemns it as one of the vilest of crimes, resulting in loss of caste and thus loss of liberation from samsara. Despite such harsh condemnation, the penalty for abortion is the withholding of water libations from the woman; while the abortionist may lose caste and, with it, opportunity for liberation from samsara.

In Buddhism, the oldest Theraveda texts condemn abortion but do not prohibit or prescribe penance. In later texts, a Buddhist monk who provides abortion is "defeated" – excluded from the religious community – if the fetus dies. If the mother dies but not the fetus, this is only a grave sin, because he had not intended to kill her.

Generally, most texts allow abortion to save the woman's life.

==== Ecclesiastical courts in Europe ====
Following the decline of the Roman Empire, Ecclesiastical courts held wide jurisdiction throughout Europe. Their purpose was to instruct and correct, rather than to punish, and therefore imposed sentences of penance, rather than corporal punishment. The Church treated the killing of an unformed or "unanimated" fetus as a matter of "anticipated homicide", with a corresponding lesser penance required, while late abortion was homicide.

One of the earliest Churchmen, Tertullian, believed that the soul of the fetus is generated by the parents along with the generation of the new body. This viewpoint, later known as traducianism, was deemed unsatisfactory by St. Augustine, as it did not account for original sin. Basing himself on the Septuagint version of Exodus 21:22, he deemed abortion, while deplorable, to be less than murder. He also affirmed the Aristotelian view of delayed hominization. St. Fulgentius opposed abortion even for the purpose of saving the woman's life, saying: "But let the child be brought to term and baptized and saved from perdition."

The Venerable Bede, in the Penitential ascribed to him by Albers c. 725, upheld the 40-day distinction, prescribing a one-year penance for abortion before the 40th day, and added that it makes a difference whether the woman was simply in financial desperation, or had conceived out of "harlotry". After 40 days the penance was 71/2 years, the same as for homicide.

In the twelfth century, in the Decretum Gratiani,

Gratian, and the medieval canon law generally, merely followed the prevailing scientific view of the period that quickening represented the time at which the fetus was "vivified," defined as the time at which it was "ensouled."

A century later, St. Thomas Aquinas upheld delayed hominization: "seed and what is not seed is determined by sensation and movement."

In 1588, Pope Sixtus V adopted a papal bull adopting the position of St. Thomas Aquinas that contraception and abortion were crimes against nature and sins against marriage. This verdict was relaxed three years later by Pope Gregory XIV, who pronounced that abortion before "hominization" should not be subject to ecclesiastical penalties that were any stricter than civil penalties.

=== Secular law ===
Historian Jeffrey H. Reiman writes: "The earliest laws of relevance to abortion were not concerns with the voluntary termination of pregnancy by the pregnant woman. They were rules providing compensation for the death of a fetus resulting from an assault on a pregnant woman. Their goal appears to have been, not to protect the rights of fetus, but to protect the rights of fathers." For example, the Code of Hammurabi and the Book of Exodus in the Hebrew Bible provide for penalties for an assault causing miscarriage. The first law prohibiting voluntary abortion appear to be the Middle Assyrian laws, about 500 years after the Code of Hammurabi. These laws provided for impalement and no burial for a woman who "has a miscarriage by her own act." Middle Assyria permitted the infanticide of children by fathers, so this harsh law "was not meant to protect fetuses" but rather "appears rather to have been aimed at keeping the decision about which offspring live or die in the hands of their fathers."

The Zend Avesta imposes a sentence of Peshôtanu (200 lashes) on a woman who, out of fear of discovery, "brings on menses" when conception occurs out of wedlock, with no mention of a penalty for the male. The Code of the Assura, c. 1075 BC has penalties for several different types of abortion crimes: if a woman aborts against her husband's wishes, if a man causes an abortion in any woman at the first stage of pregnancy; if a man causes an abortion in a harlot. In the first case, the woman is to be crucified; in the second, the man is fined two talents; and in the third, the man is to make restitution for a life.

While there were no laws against abortion in Ancient Rome, the Twelve Tables did allow for infanticide through exposure in cases of unwanted female newborns, and mandated that children born deformed also be exposed. In 211 AD, at the intersection of the reigns of Septimius Severus and Caracalla, abortions which violated the father's rights or the mother's duties were punished by temporary exile.

The Visigothic Code had a system of punishments similar to that of the Zend Avesta, with 200 lashes for a woman causing her own abortion, or for a male slave performing an abortion on a freeborn woman, but with various fines in all other circumstances.

In 9th century England, King Alfred's laws laid down the wergeld to be paid in compensation for various murders: If a man slay a woman with child, he shall pay full wergeld for the woman, and half wergeld for the dead fetus, in compensation for the husband's material loss.

In the Middle Ages, German women were allowed to expose their newborns.

==== English common law ====
Starting with Leges Henrici Primi, around 1115, abortion was treated as a misdemeanour prior to "quickening", accruing a penalty of 3 years' penance, or as a "quasi homicide" after quickening. It is believed that abortion cases were usually heard in ecclesiastical courts, which dealt with matters of morality, rather than in secular courts, which dealt with breaches of the King's peace. The punishment for the capital crime of homicide was therefore not applied. Drawing on William Staunford, Edward Coke first formulated the born alive rule in Institutes of the Lawes of England, drawing on the established definition of Murder in English law that the victim be "a reasonable creature in rerum natura. This formulation appeared in William Blackstone's commentaries and in Bouvier's Law Dictionary. Henry Bracton considered abortion to be homicide.

== Modern codification ==
Some have claimed that scientific knowledge of human fertilization was used to justify the stricter abortion laws that were codified during the nineteenth century. This ignores other, perhaps more salient, aspects of the history of abortion law. The historical debate about vivification, animation, and delayed hominization were debates about when the fetus could be considered a "reasonable creature" – a human being – not simply when it had physical life; and this is what quickening was said to signify.

The process of criminalizing abortion, however, can be placed in a broader context whereby professional associations began to employ licensing procedures as a means of driving "irregulars" out of practice in fields as diverse as medicine and architecture. Toward the end of the eighteenth century, medical associations began to co-operate "in vigorous measures for the suppression of empiricism, and the encouragement of regular practitioners" – that is, for the suppression of medicine based on practice, such as herbalism and midwifery, and the promotion of medical science based on theory – and also began to assist in the regulation, restriction, and commercialization of reproduction products such as pessaries, condoms and abortifacients. Science-based medicine at the time was based on humorism, a theory that had not changed since Galen's day, and relied to some extent on dangerous practices such as bloodletting, purging, and the extensive use of mercury, a toxin. Public backlash forced a temporary retreat, with licensing regulations being repealed during the next few decades.

In 1857, a more successful campaign was launched. The newly formed American Medical Association

"were motivated to organize for the criminalization of abortion in part by their desire to win professional power, control medical practice, and restrict their irregular competitors, including homeopaths, midwives, and others. Hostility towards feminists, immigrants, and Catholics fueled the medical campaign against abortion and the passage of abortion laws by state legislatures.

Despite a flurry of well-publicized inquests beginning with the turn of the nineteenth century, prosecutions for abortions usually proceeded only in response to a woman's death. In addition to the abortionist, unmarried men whose lovers had died were increasingly prosecuted as well, the reasoning being that only his refusal to marry could have driven a woman to abortion.
