= Maternal–fetal conflict =

Ethical dilemma in prenatal care

Maternal-fetal conflict, also known as obstetric conflict, occurs when a pregnant woman’s (maternal) interests conflict with the interests of the fetus. Legal and ethical considerations involving women's rights and the rights of the fetus as a patient and future child, have become more complicated with advances in medicine and technology. Maternal-fetal conflict can occur in situations where the mother denies health recommendations (e.g. blood transfusions, surgical procedures, cesarean section) that can benefit the fetus or make life choices (e.g. smoking, drinking alcohol, drugs, hazardous exposure) that can harm the fetus. There are maternal-fetal conflict situations where the law becomes involved, but most physicians avoid involving the law for various reasons.

== Background ==
Prior to technological advances and current obstetric practices, the fetus was viewed as part of the mother and they were viewed as one entity rather than separate entities. With advances in technology, healthcare providers are able to access the fetus directly (e.g. sampling fetal blood, urine, other tissue, etc. and high-resolution ultrasonography) resulting in the fetus being defined as a separate patient from its mother. This shift from a perspective of 'unity' (referred to as the maternal-fetal dyad) to 'duality' of the mother and fetus has created a maternal-fetal conflict. With this shift, fetal interest has been taken into consideration separately from the mother's interest. Since the fetus can only be accessed through the mother, this change in perspective has become more complicated. In the perspective of the mother and fetus as one patient (a dyad), it is necessary to consider if the combined benefits of the mother and fetus outweigh the combined burdens. When making these decisions from the perspective of 'duality', it is necessary to determine the burdens and benefits of the mother and fetus separately.

== Maternal rights ==
While a woman's right to privacy, right to autonomy, and informed consent are valued and prioritized during decision-making for the mother and fetus, there are various difficulties that arise with the perspective of the viability of a fetus, including "personhood". For example, the question of whether or not it is ethical to "gently persuade" a woman to make a decision she may not want to make because she is pregnant. In another example, a woman can receive a court-ordered cesarean section to save a fetus, but this is usually viewed as coercion, which is why most physicians avoid involving the court when helping make decisions for the mother and fetus.

== Fetus ==
=== Fetus as a patient ===
There are many factors that define whether a fetus is a patient of its own or an entity involving its mother including: the fetus's independent moral status, the future fetus as a child, and the viability of the fetus. One view is that a fetus has rights when it has an independent moral status from its mother, but some ethicists cannot agree on when this occurs. A fetus has the potential to become a child and the future of that child is taken into consideration when determining the independence of the fetus as a patient and in decision-making for the mother and fetus, (i.e. whether or not the health decisions will benefit the fetus when it becomes a child). A fetus can survive apart from its mother once it is viable. The viability of a fetus separate from its mother may confer an independent moral status. Prior to viability of the fetus, the mother's autonomy and rights are prioritized.

=== Defining a healthy fetus ===
One perspective of decision making for maternal-fetal conflict is to prioritize the health of the mother and fetus, but it is difficult to determine what 'healthy' means for a fetus, especially without infringing on the basic rights of the mother. For those that define 'healthy' as 'perfect' or 'near-perfect' the implication is that a less than perfect fetus should not be born. Some of the people who are most opposed to prioritizing fetal rights are those with disabilities. The thought of a 'healthy' or 'perfect' child does not consider what a child with a disability would feel about how their mothers would be treated for choosing to bear them.

== Maternal-fetal relationship ==
=== Experience, circumstance, and shared interest ===
With viewpoints shifting from the mother and fetus being a single unit to two individual units, understanding the mother's experiences and circumstances are necessary in decision-making. Not all women have direct control over their situation, which makes it difficult for a woman to make the best decision for their fetus. For example, a low-income mother may not be able to afford nutritious meals resulting in circumstance playing a role in maternal-fetal decisions. Instead of viewing the maternal-fetal relationship as a conflict, there are viewpoints that have shifted the perspective to maternal-fetal shared interest.

=== Protection of the fetus ===
There are different perspectives that value the protection of the fetus, but opposing viewpoints ask "what/whom is the fetus being protected from?" Most things a mother does can harm her fetus, even things that may not seem harmful (e.g. eating feta cheese or owning a cat). It is difficult to prove causality as development is multi-factorial, making it difficult to define what or who the fetus needs to be protected from. Although some may view the mother and fetus as separate entities, they are a unified dyad where the baby needs the mother to survive and their physiology is shared. This mentality allows decision-makers to best understand both patients's perspectives, and acknowledge the best interests for both the mother and their fetus.

=== Decision-making ===
The mother's autonomy and rights almost always are respected in decision-making. Decision-making is individualized based on prognosis, gestational age, and the pregnant woman's life and values. A variety of perspectives (e.g. pediatric, obstetric, etc.) are important to incorporate in decision-making process to best avoid being biased. Many ethicists have argued that women should have the same rights as non-pregnant women, which includes making decisions. It is also important to acknowledge that a mother generally will make the best decision for both herself and her fetus as she made the decision to have and continue the pregnancy. In cases where unwanted circumstances arise, it is difficult to blame a mother for uncontrollable, unfavorable fetal outcomes (e.g. birth defects) so giving the mother the benefit of the doubt is important. In order to make the best decisions for the mother and fetus, a physician-patient relationship is valuable as well as other maternal-fetal relationships (e.g. relationship to the father of the fetus, family members involved, etc.). Addressing the gestational age also affects decision making. Although, it's important to understand there is also very little information about early gestation periods, which makes it difficult to make decisions early on in the pregnancy.

== Physician role ==
As an obstetrician and caregiver for the mother as a patient, it is important a physician acknowledges how their role and decisions affect both the mother and fetus, although the mother is ultimately their patient. Physicians must prioritize the mother's rights and autonomy as well as understand the value of beneficence and non-maleficence. Those that view the fetus and mother as one entity, acknowledge the overall benefit of a decision in regards to both the fetus and mother. Those that view the fetus and mother as separate entities, cannot overlook the mother's rights for the benefits of the fetus and vice versa. Other perspectives include overriding maternal autonomy if there is a more reliable option. For example, a cesarean section could save the baby and mother's life, but the mother wants a natural birth that will kill both entities so the mother's decision could be overruled. This is not always the case as there are other factors that are taken into consideration.

=== Mediating the conflict and honoring the patient ===
Physicians are not allowed to harm one patient for the benefit of another patient (i.e. a physician cannot harm a mother for the sake of the fetus and vice versa). If there is harm to one patient, that patient must volunteer to take treatment and not be influenced by the physician's bias. This causes difficulty as the fetus cannot voluntarily take a treatment and the fetus must be accessed through the mother. To avoid issues, physicians always prioritize the pregnant woman's autonomy as the physician's obligation is to the mother. The physician should refrain from unwanted procedures and treatments mentioned by the mother. It is important to establish that her autonomy cannot harm others. In the viewpoint of a maternal-fetal dyad, the mother is both a proxy for the best interest of the fetus and also separately the decision maker for herself as a patient. According to Susan Mattingly, a mother who denies treatment that benefits the fetus can no longer be an appropriate proxy for the fetus, but physicians still have to respect her as a separate patient with her own rights and autonomy. In the viewpoint of a maternal-fetal relationship being a one-patient model, a mother would only be harming herself if she denies treatment for fetus that may benefit fetus. These situations are normally avoided because punishment based on how a woman behaves in regards to her fetus could make women avoid medical care. The best way to establish a patient-physician relationship is by following best practices, conducting informed consent discussions, preparing for any situation that may arise, offering an alternate provider, compromise, providing documentation (e.g. medical record of information, treatment options, recommendations, etc.), and providing supportive resources for both the physician and provider, if problems are to arise.

== Legal issues ==
Physicians are not required to obtain legal approval for decisions on mother and fetus, nor will a physician be in trouble with the law if they decide to make a decision on behalf of the mother and fetus. There are legal obstacles that make it difficult for the law to be involved in decision making for maternal-fetal conflict, which include the fetus having no rights, court standards being vague and flexible, discrimination towards disadvantage women, and the inability to force a woman to do things that are not required from anyone else (e.g. non-pregnant women, men, etc.). Lawmakers find it difficult to make exceptions to the law just because someone is pregnant (e.g. lawmakers find it difficult to forbid alcohol during pregnancy when non-pregnant women are permitted to drink alcohol). Allowing the fetus to have rights is difficult when it's dependent on a mother who has her own rights and autonomy. Even in the case where court-ordered cesarean sections seem necessary, most physicians and law-makers avoid it altogether as court-orders can be deemed as coercion. Women who have decisional capacity should be able to use it and refuse treatment if wanted. Because of these legal obstacles, law-makers and judges tend to prioritize women's rights to make their own decision.

=== Legal inequalities ===
The best interest of the fetus is established by the physician, but decided on by the mother. The problem is that there tends to be prejudices and inequalities when it comes to what is in the best interest of the fetus, especially in healthcare. According to Kelly Lindgren's journal, Maternal–Fetal Conflict: Court-Ordered Cesarean Section, “poor, minority women are affected most often by court-ordered c-section [...] which include: 47% Black Americans, 33% from Asia or Africa, and only 20% White.” It is also important to address that no other group of people are forced to do anything, so it is questioned why a woman who is pregnant should be forced. The court system is also reluctant to give the fetus and child the same rights. Women are burdened by laws resulting from their ability to be pregnant.

Legal case examples
Case name	Summary
Roe v. Wade	This United States Supreme Court decision ruled that it was unconstitutional to ban abortions as it goes against a woman's rights. It formulated the trimester framework: during the first trimester there can be no restrictions on abortions; during the second trimester there can be restrictions on abortions, but only for the sake of health and safety; and during the third trimester there are restrictions with exceptions
Planned Parenthood v. Casey	This United States Supreme Court decision shifted away from the trimester framework as an undue burden
Prince v. Massachusetts	This United States Supreme Court decision ruled that “Parents may be free to become martyrs themselves. But it does not follow that they are free, in identical circumstances, to make martyrs of their children”

== Ethics ==
"Good ethics begins with good facts." An ethical framework (e.g. principle-based theories, conflict-based theories, feminist theory, and ethics of care) acknowledges the pregnant woman's competency to make her own decision for her and her body, including the fetus, but with the fetus’ well-being in mind. Acknowledging what happens after the fetus is delivered is the post-delivery perspective of pediatricians.

=== Principle-based and conflict-based theories ===
Principle-based theory is defined as "respect for patient autonomy, beneficence non-maleficence, and justice to guide conflict resolution." Conflict-based theories emphasize women's rights to autonomy and the physician's moral obligation to both the woman and the fetus separately. Conflict arises as pregnancy is only unique to women, which is why it is necessary to prioritize women's autonomy and rights. When the fetal interest is prioritized, it imposes on social and racial equality.

=== Feminist theory ===
Feminist theory (also known as feminist ethics) is a gender-based perspective, which acknowledges that women are treated differently in decision-making.

=== Ethics of care and relational ethics ===
Ethics of care and relational ethics acknowledges human relationships (i.e. relationship of patient to fetus, physician, community, society, etc.) as well as a woman's life experiences (e.g. age, political view, religion, lifestyle, etc.) and how that affects a person's decision-making. In terms of maternal-fetal conflict, it emphasizes understanding the patient's values and experiences to best support her decisions.

Sample of conflicting health problems affecting mother and fetus
Health problem	Summary
Pre-eclampsia	Pre-eclampsia is a pregnancy disorder where maternal hypertension and proteinuria can occur.
Cancer	The most common types of cancers associated with pregnancies include melanoma, lymphomas, and leukemia as well as cancer of the cervix, thyroid, ovary, breast, and colon. Maternal cancer therapy (e.g. chemotherapy, radiotherapy, or surgical oncology) tends to cause risks for fetus.
Immunological diseases	The mother and fetus have their own individual immunological interfaces, which can cause immunological diseases.

=== The case of Medea ===
M. C. Reid's journal, "The case of Medea—a view of fetal-maternal conflict" alludes to the Greek Myth of Medea as it addresses maternal-fetal scenarios. The myth of Medea is about a woman named Medea who killed her two children as revenge against her husband. M. C. Reid compares Madea to several maternal-fetal scenarios, those of Meilssa, Nada, and Olga through the use of conflict theories based on:

1. the reason for the act.
2. the life of the moral patients.
3. the rights of the moral agent.

==== The reason for the act ====
There could be several reasons behind an act: is it inherently vicious (e.g. based on hatred, cruelty, greed, etc.); is it a morally commended act (e.g. based on respect, consideration, compassion, etc.); or is it a neutral act (e.g. based on no motives, accidental situations, etc.). Certain acts can seem good, but with vicious motives. For example, a surgeon does an intervention because they are sadistic, but the procedure helps the patient resulting in a good act, but with vicious intent. Reid argues that a mother would unlikely act purposely vicious toward her fetus.

==== The life of the moral patients ====
There are many different views of the maternal-fetal relationship:

- One point of view addresses how the fetus affects the mother as they share a physiology, which is a counter-view to the fetus being separate from its mother.
- Another perspective is the fetus being part of the mother as one unit, but the fetus gradually increases in moral value as a patient.
- A third perspective is that the fetus is not of moral value until birth.

==== The rights of the moral agent ====
Women have rights and autonomy; some argue that these rights are under threat during situations involving abortion. As long as a woman is competent to make decisions regarding her own body and fetus, she is considered eligible to make decisions and retain her autonomy and rights.

==== Conflict analysis ====
The case of Medea uses conflict theories to address and compare Medea's story to three other fictional women: Melissa, Nada, and Olga.

The case of Medea conflict analysis
	Background story	Reason for the act	Life of the moral patient	Rights of the moral participants
Medea	As an act of revenge against her husband, Madea killed her two children.	While clear and understandable, the act as not justifiable.	Considering the status of a woman in Greece in Medea's era, where she sacrificed a lot for her husband, this act was a way for her to reclaim her personhood.	The children are innocent, yet their mother killed them.
Melissa	Melissa is 30 weeks pregnant with twins, and wants to terminate her pregnancy	The justification is similar to Medea's situation.	Denying termination of the pregnancy means denying Melissa's rights.	The difference between Melissa's situation and that of Medea's is that the fetal twins have different moral value than born children, but there is no justification for the termination other than Melissa not wanting to continue the pregnancy.
Nada	Nada, at 24 weeks of pregnancy has HTN-of-pregnancy (HOP) syndrome, where there is a risk of brain hemorrhage and seizures to the mother. She has to terminate the pregnancy to save her life, but is upset about it.	In order to save the life of the mother, the termination is justifiable.	No one is expected to sacrifice one's own life for another.	Based on the gradualist point of view, the moral status of the fetus is less in value at early gestational age.
Olga	At 22 weeks of pregnancy, Olga has mixed feelings, but no strong dislike for the fetus. She prefers to not go through with pregnancy because she believes the pregnancy is becoming a burden.	While there is no absolute wrong in this situation, it cannot be quite justifiable.	Denying termination of the pregnancy means denying Olga's rights.	This is a very nebulous situation because if the fetus is a burden, but not a health problem, it is necessary to weigh the needs of the fetus and mother.
