= Pregnancy-associated femicide =

Type of homicide

Pregnancy-associated femicide is a form of gender-based violence involving the murder of a woman during the period of pregnancy and up to 1 year after childbirth.

Pregnancy increases the likelihood of femicide. Globally, intimate partner violence (IPV) and familial abuse precede the majority of pregnancy-associated femicides, with male intimate partners being the primary perpetrators. In the United States, homicide is a leading cause of death for pregnant and postpartum women. Women are more likely to be murdered during the pregnancy and postpartum period than to die from the three principal obstetric causes of maternal death (high-blood pressure disorders, hemorrhage, sepsis) or cardiovascular disease.

Pregnancy-associated femicide is a developing field of study. Researchers and activists are calling for the implementation of intervention methods in healthcare and policy, as well as standardized documentation of incidence rate, in order to address the sociopolitical factors contributing to the issue.

== Statistics ==
=== United States ===
Age-adjusted mortality rate per 100,000 pregnant and recently pregnant women in 2019 and 2020 in the United States.

Femicide is a leading cause of death for pregnant and postpartum women. The risk of femicide for pregnant and postpartum women is 35% greater than for nonpregnant and nonpostpartum women. As of 2020, the pregnancy-associated femicide ratio was 5.23 femicides per 100,000 live births. This represents a 32.4% increase from the previous year, in correspondence with the increase in IPV since the onset of the COVID-19 pandemic. Femicides during pregnancy represented 54% of these cases. Black women accounted for 55% of cases; White women accounted for 30.1%; and Hispanic women and other racialized groups accounted for the remainder. In 45% of cases, the victims were under 25 years old. Firearms were responsible for 81% of incidents. Assault by a sharp object and strangulation were, respectively, the second and third most common method of homicide.

When data on victim-perpetrator relationship is available, most pregnancy-associated femicides involve a precedence of IPV, and nearly two-thirds of cases took place within the home. Female victims of IPV, for whom 1 in 6 are first abused during pregnancy, are 4 times as likely to report increased severity in violence during pregnancy than nonpregnant abused women. The risk of being a victim of femicide is therefore tripled for women experiencing IPV during pregnancy. For Black women abused during pregnancy, their risk is tripled, as compared to white women experiencing abuse during pregnancy

=== Global ===
While research on pregnancy-associated femicide primarily centres the United States, recent emergent research on global trends largely corroborates the findings of American researchers. Globally, pregnancy represents a significant risk factor in the likelihood of femicide. Male intimate partners compose the majority of perpetrators, and between one-third and two-thirds of cases were preceded by IPV. In Argentina, where rates of femicide are on the rise, femicide by an intimate partner is as a leading cause of death for pregnant and postpartum women.

=== Limitations of statistics ===
The maternal mortality ratio does not include pregnancy-associated femicide. Furthermore, death records in the majority of countries are not required to include victim-perpetrator relationship or history of IPV. Researchers therefore suggest that rates of incidence are higher than reported due to the lack of standardization in documenting pregnancy-associated femicides.

== Laws and policies ==
=== United States ===
38 American states have laws with harsher penalties if the victim is murdered while pregnant. The Unborn Victims of Violence Act of 2004 recognizes a fetus as a legal crime victim if "fetal injury or death occurs during the commission of a federal violent crime". These laws define the fetus as a person "for the purpose of criminal prosecution of the offender" (National Conference of State Legislatures, 2008).

The United States does not have specific policy addressing victims of femicide, and does not provide a legal definition of femicide in its criminal code.

=== Latin America ===
As of 2022, policy changes in 20 Latin American countries have introduced femicide as a distinct type of homicide. Latin American feminist movements are demanding further legislation addressing pregnancy as a significant risk factor. A 2015 Brazilian law increased penalties for violent crimes committed against pregnant women.

== Intervention ==
=== Healthcare ===
==== Intimate Partner Violence screening and care ====
Prenatal and postnatal care visits represent an opportunity for patients to disclose abuse, or for healthcare providers to identify warning signs of IPV. Researchers therefore recommend universal screening for IPV during obstetric visits, as well as standardized, adequate training for obstetricians in identifying IPV and providing care in cases of positive screening.

==== Racial disparity ====
Studies identify structural racial disparities in healthcare as contributing to the elevated rate of pregnancy-associated femicide amongst Black women. Due to historical racial biases in the healthcare system, Black female patients have reduced access to prenatal and postnatal care, and may be mistrustful of healthcare providers. Consequently, they have fewer opportunities to disclose IPV during pregnancy, and are less likely to do so during obstetric visits, thus decreasing the chance for early intervention. Researchers therefore emphasize addressing racial inequities in healthcare, as well as implementing training programs for providers concerning racial biases, as a significant intervention method.

=== Reproductive rights ===
The lack of access to safe and legal abortion increases the risk pregnancy-associated femicide by an intimate partner. Abuse during a previous pregnancy is cited by 27.3% of women as an influencing factor in their decision to get an abortion. Researchers in the United States caution that recent legislation restricting access to abortion, like the Texas Heartbeat Act and the overturning of Roe V. Wade in 2022, risks exacerbating the increasing number of pregnancy-associated femicides. Researchers and feminist movements like Ni una menos echo these warnings regarding women's reproductive rights in Latin America. The implementation and maintenance of reproductive rights is therefore cited as a crucial intervention method.

=== Gun control ===
In the United States, the likelihood of intimate partner homicide by state corresponds to state levels of gun ownership, and firearms are the primary weapon in pregnancy-associated femicides. Researchers therefore identify stricter gun laws, specifically in the United States, as a necessary intervention.

=== Policy and standardized documentation ===
Researchers recommend the universal adoption of pregnancy and history of IPV checkboxes in homicide death records, as well the inclusion of pregnancy-associated femicide in maternal mortality reviews. They maintain that accurate and efficient documentation of incidence rates increases efficiency in prevention.

== Notable cases ==
Laci Peterson (1975-2002) was murdered on December 24, 2002 while 7 months pregnant. Laci's husband, Scott Peterson, was convicted in 2004 of first-degree murder for her death, and of second-degree murder for the death of their unborn son Conner. The alternate title for the Unborn Victims of Violence Act of 2004 is Laci and Conner's Law. The release of the Netflix docuseries American Murder: Laci Peterson on August 14, 2024, and the Peacock docuseries Face to Face with Scott Peterson on August 20, 2024 generated renewed public attention on the case.

19-year-old Rukhsana Naz was strangled by her brother, while her mother held her down in an honour killing at her home in Derby in March 1998, due to her refusal to terminate her pregnancy.

Chiara Páez was killed in May 2015 during her first trimester of pregnancy. Chiara's murder accelerated the Ni una menos movement in Argentina, which then spread to other Latin American countries.

== See also ==
- Femicide in Latin America
