= Fetal rights =

Moral or legal rights of the human fetus

Fetal rights or foetal rights (alternatively prenatal rights) are the moral rights or legal rights of the human embryo or fetus under natural and civil law. The term fetal rights came into wide usage after Roe v. Wade, the 1973 landmark case that established a constitutional right to abortion in the United States; that decision was overturned in 2022 by Dobbs v. Jackson Women's Health Organization. The concept of fetal rights has evolved to include the issues of maternal substance use disorders, including alcohol use disorder and opioid use disorder. Most international human rights charters "clearly reject claims that human rights should attach from conception or any time before birth." While most international human rights instruments lack a universal inclusion of the fetus as a person for the purposes of human rights, the fetus is granted various rights in the constitutions and civil codes of some countries.

Because a fetus develops within another person's body, the recognition of fetal rights raises the question of how those rights relate to the rights of the pregnant woman, discussed in legal and bioethical literature as maternal-fetal conflict. The American College of Obstetricians and Gynecologists holds that pregnancy is not an exception to a patient's right to refuse medical treatment and opposes forced and court-ordered obstetric intervention. A peer-reviewed study of the United States identified 413 cases between 1973 and 2005 in which a woman's pregnancy was a necessary factor leading to her arrest, detention, or a comparable deprivation of physical liberty.

== Terminology ==
Some jurisdictions assign rights before the fetal stage proper. In Italy, embryos are treated as subjects of law from fertilisation, including before implantation where fertilisation occurs in vitro.

The terminology of the field is itself contested. Fetus is the standard clinical term for the stage of prenatal development beginning around the ninth week of gestation, while unborn child predominates in political and legislative usage. Examining the latter phrase, the bioethicists Laurence B. McCullough and Frank A. Chervenak distinguished its descriptive from its normative uses and argued that its normative content does not establish the independent moral status of the fetus or a fetal right to life; they proposed that the concept of the fetus as a patient, carrying dependent rather than independent moral status, should replace normative use of unborn child. The article appeared with several open peer commentaries disputing both the distinction and the conclusions drawn from it.

== History ==
In antiquity, the fetus was sometimes protected by restrictions on abortion. Some versions of the Hippocratic Oath indirectly protected the fetus by prohibiting abortifacients. Until approximately the mid-19th century, philosophical views on the fetus were influenced in part by Aristotelian concept of delayed hominization. According to it, human fetuses only gradually acquire their souls, and in the early stages of pregnancy the fetus is not fully human. Relying on examinations of miscarried fetuses, Aristotle believed that male fetuses acquire their basic form at around day 40, and female ones at day 90. For Pythagoreans, however, fetal life was co-equal in moral worth with adult human life from the moment of conception; similar views were held by Stoics. Ancient Athenian law did not recognise fetal right to life before the ritual acknowledgement of the child. The law, however, allowed for the postponement of the execution of sentenced pregnant women until a baby was delivered.

Several Hindu texts on ethics and righteousness, such as Dharmaśāstra, give fetus a right to life from conception, although in practice such texts are not always followed.

The property law of the Roman Empire granted fetus inheritance rights. As long as the fetus was conceived before the testator's death (usually, the father) and then born alive, their inheritance rights were equal to those born before the testator's death. Even though under Roman law the fetus was not a legal subject, it was a potential person whose property rights were protected after birth. Roman jurist Ulpian noted that "in the Law of the Twelve Tables he who was in the womb is admitted to the legitimate succession, if he has been born". Another jurist Julius Paulus similarly noted, that "the ancients provided for the free unborn child in such a way that they preserved for it all legal rights intact until the time of birth". The inheritance rights of the fetus were means of fulfilling the testator's will. The interests of the fetus could be protected by a custodian, usually a male relative, but in some cases a woman herself could be appointed the custodian. The Digest granted the fetus consanguinity rights, vesting the protection of fetal interests in the praetor. The Digest also prohibited the execution of pregnant women until delivery. The Roman law also envisaged that if a slave mother had been free for any period between the time of the conception and childbirth, the child would be regarded as born free. Although the mother might have become slave again before the childbirth, it was considered that the unborn should not be prejudiced by the mother's misfortune. At the same time, Greek and Roman sources do not mention issues of alcohol consumption by pregnant women. On that basis it is believed that Greeks and Romans were not aware of the fetal alcohol syndrome.

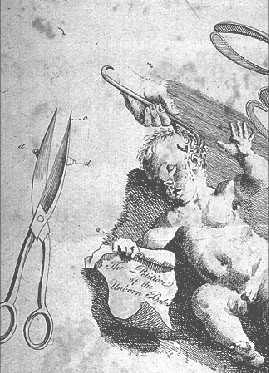
A baby holding the "Petition of the Unborn Babes", 18th century illustration.

After the spread of Christianity, an issue emerged: whether it was permissible for a pregnant woman to be baptised before childbirth, due to uncertainty as to whether the fetus would be cobaptised with its mother. The Synod of Neo-Caesarea decided that the baptism of a pregnant woman in any stage of gestation did not include the fetus. In the Middle Ages, fetal rights were closely associated with the concept of ensoulment. In some cases the fetus could also inherit or be in the order of succession. In the Byzantine Empire, a fetus was regarded as a natural person and could inherit alongside blood descendants and slaves. Byzantine Emperor Michael VIII Palaiologos allowed soldiers to transfer their pronoiai to their unborn children. The unborn royals were increasingly granted the right to succession. In 1284, King of Scotland Alexander III designated his future unborn children as heirs presumptive by the act of parliament to avoid potential squabbles among loyal descendants of his lineage. The 1315 entail of Scottish king Robert the Bruce allowed the unborn collateral individuals to be in line for the throne beyond his brother Edward and daughter Marjorie Bruce. After the death of Albert II of Germany in 1439, his then-unborn son Ladislaus the Posthumous inherited his father's sovereign rights. In 1536, the British Parliament gave the unborn children of Henry VIII and Jane Seymour precedence in the line of royal succession. The medieval distinction between the ensouled and the unensouled fetus was removed after Pope Pius IX decreed in 1854 that the ensoulment of Virgin Mary occurred at conception.

In 1751, a pamphlet "The Petition of the Unborn Babes to the Censors of the Royal College of Physicians of London" by physician Frank Nicholls was published, advocating fetal right to life and protection. The pamphlet anticipated many of the arguments of the 21st century's pro-life movement. In 1762, English jurist and judge William Blackstone wrote that an "infant in its mother's womb" could benefit from a legacy and receive an estate as if it were actually bom. The fetus was thus considered a person for purposes of inheritance. Similarly to the Roman law, the Napoleonic Code envisaged that if a woman becomes a widow, a male guardian should be appointed for her unborn child.

In the 20th century and particularly after World War II fetal rights issues continued to develop. In 1948, the Declaration of Geneva was adopted which prior to amendments in 1983 and 2005, advised physicians to "maintain the utmost respect for human life from the time of its conception". In 1967, American Bar Association Journal noted "the modern trend of legal decisions that grant every property and personal right to the unborn child, including the right to life itself, from conception on". In 1975, while interpreting the right to life under the Basic Law of Germany, the Federal Constitutional Court opined that "life in the sense of historical existence of a human individual" exists "at least from the 14th day after conception (nidation, individuation)" and thus everyone's right to life under the Basic Law of Germany includes the unborn as human beings. The 1980s witnessed the reappearance of fetal protection in the workplace, aimed at guarding fetal health in potentially hazardous working conditions. In 1983, Ireland was one of the first countries in the world to constitutionalize a fetal right to life by passing the Eighth Amendment to the Constitution, later repealed in September 2018.

== Modern regulations ==
The only modern international treaty specifically tackling the fetal rights is the American Convention on Human Rights which envisages the fetal right to life from the moment of conception. The convention was ratified by twenty five countries of the Americas (two countries later denounced the convention leading the current number of ratifiers to be twenty three) (Note: Argentina, Barbados, Bolivia, Brazil, Chile, Colombia, Costa Rica, Dominica, Ecuador, El Salvador, Grenada, Guatemala, Haiti, Honduras, Jamaica, Mexico, Nicaragua, Panama, Paraguay, Peru, Dominican Republic, Suriname, Trinidad and Tobago (denounced), Uruguay and Venezuela (denounced).) in 1973–1993. Mexico ratified the convention with the reservation that the expression "in general" concerning the fetal right to life does not constitute an obligation and that this matter falls within the domain of the states. While the convention may be interpreted to permit domestic abortion laws in exceptional circumstances, it effectively declares the fetus a person. However, only a minority of state ratifiers completely prohibit abortion without allowing for an exception when the pregnant woman's life is in danger (Dominican Republic, El Salvador and Nicaragua).

Based on the 1959 Declaration of the Rights of the Child, preambular paragraph 9 of the Convention on the Rights of the Child (CRC) states that "the child... needs... appropriate legal protection before as well as after birth", but due to ambiguity the legal protection of the fetus conflicts with the rights of a pregnant girl under the same Convention. Such conflict is sometimes called maternal-fetal conflict. Under CRC, the rights of a pregnant girl are interpreted as superseding those of her fetus. The states retain the power to decide for themselves what prenatal legal protection they would adopt under CRC. A proposal to grant fetus the right to life from conception was put forward by Belgium, Brazil, El Salvador, Mexico and Morocco during drafting of the International Covenant on Civil and Political Rights (ICCPR), but it was rejected in favor of less stringent wording. At the same time, ICCPR prohibits the execution of pregnant women.

The World Medical Association Declaration on Therapeutic Abortion notes that "circumstances bringing the interests of a mother into conflict with the interests of her unborn child create a dilemma and raise the question as to whether or not the pregnancy should be deliberately terminated". The Dublin Declaration on Maternal Healthcare, signed in 2012, prioritizes fetal right to life by noting that "there is a fundamental difference between abortion, and necessary medical treatments that are carried out to save the life of the mother, even if such treatment results in the loss of life of her unborn child". Several organizations, such as World Health Organization (WHO) and Human Rights Watch prioritize women's reproductive rights over fetal rights.

Under European law, a fetus is generally regarded as an in utero part of the mother and thus its rights are held by the mother. The European Court of Human Rights opined that the right to life does not extend to fetuses under Article 2 of the European Convention on Human Rights (ECHR). In H. v. Norway, the European Commission did not exclude that "in certain circumstances" the fetus may enjoy "a certain protection under Article 2, first sentence". Two European Union member states (Hungary and Slovakia) grant the fetus the constitutional right to life. The Constitution of Norway grants the unborn royal children the right of succession to the throne. In English common law, fetus is granted inheritance rights under the born alive rule.

Islamic law grants the fetus the right to life particularly after ensoulment, which according to various Islamic jurists happens after 40–42 days or four months after conception (some Shiite jurists believe the ensoulment occurs after 11 to 14 days, during the implantation of the fertilized egg in the uterine wall). Both the Sunni and Shiite jurists accord the fetus inheritance rights under two conditions: if a man dies and a pregnant wife survives him, the fetal right to inherit is secure and the inheritance cannot be disposed of before the fetus' share is set aside. Under the second condition, if a woman aborts the fetus at any stage and ignores any vital signs, the fetus is entitled to the inheritance of any legitimate legator who dies after its conception.

The legal debate on fetal rights sometimes invokes the notion of fetal viability. Its primary determinant is fetal lung capacity which typically develops at twenty-three to twenty-four weeks. The twenty-three weeks is usually regarded as the lower bound of fetal viability because technology has been unable to surpass the limit set by lung development. It was nonetheless stated that technology has made it possible to regard the fetus as a patient independent of the mother. In Winnipeg Child and Family Services v. G., the judges argued that "technologies like real-time ultrasound, fetal heart monitors and foetoscopy can clearly show us that the fetus is alive" and thus the born alive rule is "outdated and indefensible".

The creation of human embryos for all research purposes is prohibited by the Convention for the Protection of Human Rights and Dignity of the Human Being with regard to the Application of Biology and Medicine. However, similarly to the abortion debate, in the normative debate on embryo research two views can be distinguished: a "fetalist" view focusing on the moral value of the embryo, and a "feminist" view advocating the interests of women, particularly candidate oocyte donors.

== Relationship to the rights of pregnant women ==
Because gestation takes place within another person's body, legal rights attaching to the fetus can come into tension with the rights of the pregnant woman, a problem discussed in the bioethical and legal literature as maternal-fetal conflict. In a committee opinion first issued in 2016, the American College of Obstetricians and Gynecologists stated that pregnancy is not an exception to the principle that a decisionally capable patient may refuse treatment, including treatment needed to sustain life; that the use of coercion to influence a pregnant patient's clinical decisions is never acceptable; and that medical institutions are strongly discouraged from seeking court-ordered interventions.

=== Arrests and prosecutions ===
In a study published in the Journal of Health Politics, Policy and Law in 2013, Lynn M. Paltrow and Jeanne Flavin documented 413 cases in the United States between 1973 and 2005 in which a woman's pregnancy was a necessary factor leading to an arrest, detention, or comparable deprivation of physical liberty. The authors reported that the cases disproportionately involved low-income women and women of colour, and that the legal claims used to support the deprivations frequently relied on statutes recognising separate rights for embryos and fetuses.

Following Dobbs v. Jackson Women's Health Organization, the advocacy organisation Pregnancy Justice reported at least 412 prosecutions across sixteen states in the two years to June 2024 charging individuals with crimes connected to their pregnancy, pregnancy loss, or birth, with Alabama, Oklahoma, and South Carolina accounting for the majority. The organisation reported that 399 of the cases involved allegations of substance use during pregnancy, 31 followed a pregnancy loss, and 9 involved allegations relating to abortion, and described its figures as an undercount. Most United States fetal-homicide statutes, including the federal Unborn Victims of Violence Act, expressly exempt the pregnant woman herself from prosecution.

=== Prosecutions following pregnancy loss ===
In Ohio in 2023, Brittany Watts was charged with felony abuse of a corpse after miscarrying at home at approximately 22 weeks following a premature rupture of membranes; a grand jury declined to indict her in January 2024, and the county prosecutor stated that his office did not believe the statute had been violated.

El Salvador, which prohibited abortion in all circumstances in 1998 and amended its constitution the following year to recognise the right to life from conception, has prosecuted at least 181 women over two decades following obstetric emergencies, according to the Citizen Group for the Decriminalisation of Abortion. Many were charged not with abortion, which carries a two- to eight-year term, but with aggravated homicide, which carries thirty years. A campaign launched in 2014 under the name "Las 17" sought the release of seventeen such women. Teodora del Carmen Vásquez, convicted of aggravated homicide after a stillbirth, had her sentence commuted by the Salvadoran Supreme Court in 2018 after more than ten years in prison, and others were released on findings of due-process violations. In November 2021 the Inter-American Court of Human Rights found El Salvador responsible in the case of a woman known as Manuela, who was convicted of aggravated homicide following an obstetric emergency and died in prison, and ordered the state to reform its law.

In England and Wales, where ending one's own pregnancy outside the terms of the Abortion Act 1967 remained an offence under the Offences Against the Person Act 1861, abortion providers recorded more than 100 women investigated by police over five years, some of them following natural pregnancy loss. Carla Foster was imprisoned in 2023 before the Court of Appeal suspended her sentence, and in May 2025 a jury acquitted Nicola Packer after a four-year investigation. The Crime and Policing Act 2026, which received royal assent on 29 April 2026, removed women from the criminal law in relation to ending their own pregnancies.

=== Medical decision-making and end-of-life care ===
More than half of United States states have "pregnancy exclusions" in their advance directive statutes, provisions that suspend or invalidate a directive while the declarant is pregnant; in a subset of states the exclusion voids the directive throughout pregnancy regardless of fetal viability. A 2021 federal ruling in Almerico v. Denney held Idaho officials' application of that state's provision unconstitutional, and Colorado and Washington repealed their exclusions in 2021 and 2025 respectively.

The question drew wide attention in 2025 in the case of Adriana Smith, a Georgia woman declared brain dead at approximately nine weeks' gestation whose bodily functions were maintained for around sixteen weeks until delivery by caesarean section, which her family said was done without their consent. Her family and hospital staff attributed the decision to Georgia's fetal-heartbeat statute and the state's advance-directive law, while the Georgia attorney general stated that the abortion statute did not require it.

=== Assisted reproduction ===
In LePage v. Mobile Infirmary Clinic (2024) the Supreme Court of Alabama held that frozen embryos created through in vitro fertilisation are "children" within the meaning of the state's Wrongful Death of a Minor Act, the first such ruling in the United States. Several Alabama fertility clinics suspended treatment, and three weeks later the state legislature enacted immunity from civil and criminal liability for IVF providers, leaving the court's definition of "child" in place.

== Prenatal personhood ==
In most jurisdictions the embryo or fetus is not a subject of law or a bearer of subjective rights. Aude Bertrand-Mirkovic has argued that children in the prenatal stage are human persons but do not require legal personhood, their interests being adequately protected through objective law. Civil-law systems commonly apply the infans conceptus rule, inherited from Roman law, under which the unborn child is treated as already born whenever doing so is in its interest; the rule's operation is conditioned on live, and in some jurisdictions viable, birth. The corresponding principle in common law is the born alive rule, under which responsibility for injuries inflicted on a fetus in utero does not arise unless and until the child is born alive.

In some countries, including El Salvador, Italy, and Peru, the child in the prenatal stage is given the status of a subject of law. In civil-law jurisdictions most subjective property rights recognised before birth can be exercised only after it.

== Fetal (prenatal) rights by country ==
Country	Constitutional protection of fetal rights		Recognition of personhood	
Canada	No		No	223. When child becomes human being; A child becomes a human being within the meaning of this Act when it has completely proceeded, in a living state, from the body of its mother, whether or not: (a) it has breathed; (b) it has an independent circulation; or (c) the navel string is severed.
Chile	Yes	Article 19 The Constitution guarantees all persons: 1.The right to life and to the physical and mental integrity of the person. The law protects the life of the unborn.	Yes	
Dominican Republic	Yes	Article 37 The right to life is inviolable from conception until death. The death penalty may not be established, pronounced, nor applied in any case.	Yes	
Ecuador	Yes	Article 45 Children and adolescents shall enjoy the rights that are common to all human beings, in addition to those that are specific to their age. The State shall recognize and guarantee life, including care and protection from the time of conception.	Yes	
El Salvador	Yes	Article 1 El Salvador recognizes the human person as the origin and the end of the activity of the State, which is organized to attain justice, judicial security, and the common good. In that same manner, it recognizes as a human person every human being since the moment of conception.	Yes	
Guatemala	Yes	Article 3 The State guarantees and protects the human life from its conception, as well as the integrity and security of the person.	Yes	
Hungary	Yes	Article 2 Human dignity shall be inviolable. Every human being shall have the right to life and human dignity; the life of the foetus shall be protected from the moment of conception.	Yes	
Honduras	Yes	Article 67 The unborn shall be considered as born for all rights accorded within the limits established by law.	Yes	
Madagascar	Yes	Article 19 The State recognizes and organizes for all individuals the right to the protection of health from their conception through the organization of free public health care, which gratuitousness results from the capacity of the national solidarity.	Yes	
Peru	Yes	Article 2. To life, his identity, his moral, psychical, and physical integrity, and his free development and well-being. The unborn child is a rights-bearing subject in all cases that benefit him.	Yes	
Brazil	No		Yes	Article 2. The civil personality of the person starts in the birth with the life, but the law safeguard, since the conception, the rights of the unborn.
Philippines	Yes	Section 12 The State recognizes the sanctity of family life and shall protect and strengthen the family as a basic autonomous social institution. It shall equally protect the life of the mother and the life of the unborn from conception.	Yes	
Slovakia	Yes	Article 15: 1. Everyone has the right to life. Human life is worthy of protection already before birth.	Yes	
Solomon Islands	No		Yes	

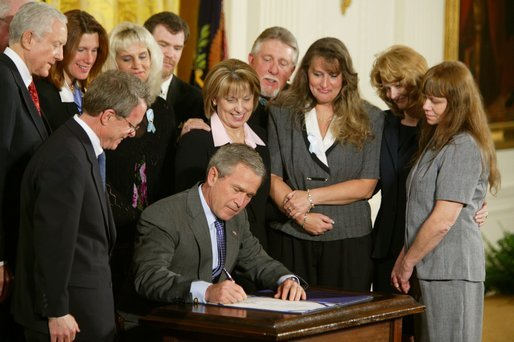
United States President George W. Bush signs the Unborn Victims of Violence Act of 2004

The Eighth Amendment of the Constitution of Ireland gave "the unborn" a right to life equal to that of "the mother". In 2018, the Supreme Court ruled that the fetus' only inherent constitutionally protected right is the right to be born, overturning a High Court ruling that a fetus additionally possessed the children's rights guaranteed by Article 42A of the Constitution. On 25 May 2018, a referendum was passed which amended the Constitution by the substitution of the former provision recognising the right to life of the unborn, with one permitting the Oireachtas, the Irish Parliament, to legislate for the termination of pregnancies. This amendment took effect when it was signed into law by the President of Ireland on 18 September 2018, and abortion was governed by the Protection of Life During Pregnancy Act 2013 until it was replaced and repealed by the Health (Regulation of Termination of Pregnancy) Act 2018, which took effect on 1 January 2019.

In the United States, thirty-eight states have statutes under which homicide charges may be brought for causing the loss of a pregnancy. All US states—by statute, court rule or case law—permit a guardian ad litem to represent the interests of the unborn. In 1999, the Unborn Victims of Violence Act was introduced into United States Congress which defines violent assault committed against pregnant women as being a crime against two victims: the woman and the fetus she carries. This law was passed in 2004 after the murder of Laci Peterson and the fetus she was carrying. In 2002, U.S. President George W. Bush announced a plan to ensure health care coverage for fetuses under the State Children's Health Insurance Program (SCHIP).

The civil codes of several countries, such as China (including Hong Kong and Macau) and Russia, as well as some US states, grant fetus inheritance rights, usually under the born alive rule. In the civil code of Iran, fetus can inherit in case of abortion that took place due to a crime, as long as the fetus was alive even for a second after birth. Under the civil code of Japan, for the purposes of inheritance the fetus is deemed to have already been born. The civil codes of the Philippines and Spain envisage that donations to the unborn children can be made and accepted by "persons who would legally represent them if they were already born". The same is allowed by the Malikis.

Alongside Norway, the Constitution of Bhutan grants the unborn royal children the right to succession, but only if there is no direct heir.

== Behavioral intervention ==
Various initiatives, prompted by concern for the ill effects which might be posed to the health or development of a fetus, seek to restrict or discourage women from engaging in certain behaviors while pregnant. Also, in some countries, laws have been passed to restrict the practice of abortion based upon the gender of the fetus.

- Many jurisdictions actively warn against the consumption of alcoholic beverages by pregnant women, recommending a maximum intake or total abstinence, due to its association with fetal alcohol syndrome. Countries that encourage those who are pregnant to avoid alcohol either entirely or partially include Australia, Canada, France, Iceland, Israel, the Netherlands, Norway, New Zealand, Spain, the United Kingdom, and the United States. In Poland in 2017 a bill was proposed that would limit the liberty of a woman (coercive and preventive measures such as isolation) who was known to drink during pregnancy. But the draw of the bill was not brought up because it was considered controversial and an erosion of women's autonomy and liberty.
- Many national and international agencies recommend dietary guidelines for pregnant women due to the health risks posed by the consumption of fish contaminated with methylmercury through industrial pollution. Studies have linked exposure to various levels of methylmercury in utero to neurological disorders in children.
- The use of tobacco products or exposure to secondhand smoke during pregnancy has been linked to low birth weight. Governor Mike Huckabee of Arkansas, citing studies which attribute 10% of infant deaths to tobacco-smoking mothers, considered adopting a smoking ban for pregnant women in 2006 with the aim of reducing infant mortality.
- It has been estimated that at least 200 American women have been criminally prosecuted or arrested under existing child abuse statutes for allegedly bringing about harm in-utero through their conduct during pregnancy. Reasons for pressing charges included use of illicit substances, consumption of alcohol, and failure to comply with a doctor's order of bedrest or caesarean section. Drug addicts have been accused of "supplying drugs to a minor" through unintentional chemical subjection via the umbilical cord. Others have been charged with assault with a deadly weapon with the "deadly weapon" in question being an illegal drug. Minnesota, Wisconsin and South Dakota allow women who continue to use substances while pregnant to be civilly committed. Some states require that medical providers report any infant who is born with a physical dependency, or who tests positive for residual traces of alcohol or drugs, to child welfare authorities.
- Cultural preferences for male children in some parts of Asia, such as Mainland China, India, South Korea, and Taiwan, have sometimes led to sex-selective abortion of female fetuses, leading to the disparity between male-to-female birth rates which is observed in some places. It is a crime in all these jurisdictions to procure an abortion for the purposes of sex selection.

== See also ==
- Anti-abortion movements
- Abortion under Egyptian law
- Beginning of human personhood
- Born alive rule
- Departurism
- Children's rights
- Embryo adoption
- History of abortion law debate
- Natural and legal rights
- Nutrition and pregnancy
- Philosophical aspects of the abortion debate
- Prenatal care
- Reproductive justice
- Stem cell controversy
- Stem cell laws
- Women's reproductive rights
