= Unborn Victims of Violence Act =

2004 American law regarding an unborn child

Unborn Victims of Violence Act of 2004
- Long title: An Act To amend title 18, United States Code, and the Uniform Code of Military Justice to protect unborn children from assault and murder, and for other purposes.
- Nicknames: Laci and Conner's Law
- Enacted by: the 108th United States Congress

Citations
- Public law: Pub. L. 108–212 (text) (PDF)
- Statutes at Large: 118 Stat. 568–570

Codification
- Titles amended: 18, 10
- U.S.C. sections created: 18 U.S.C. § 1841, 10 U.S.C. § 919a

Legislative history
- Introduced in the House as H.R. 1997 by Melissa Hart (R-PA) on May 7, 2003; Committee consideration by House Judiciary; Passed the House on February 26, 2004 (254–163); Passed the Senate on March 25, 2004 (61–38); Signed into law by President George W. Bush on April 1, 2004

The Unborn Victims of Violence Act of 2004 (Public Law 108-212) is a United States law that recognizes a "child in utero" as a legal victim, if they are injured or killed during the commission of any of over 60 listed federal crimes of violence. The law defines this term, “child in utero" as "a member of the species Homo sapiens, at any stage of development, who is carried in the womb."

The law is codified in two sections of the United States Code: Title 18, Chapter 1 (Crimes), §1841 (18 USC 1841) and Title 10, Chapter 22 (Uniform Code of Military Justice) §919a (Article 119a). The law applies only to certain offenses over which the United States government has jurisdiction, including certain crimes committed on federal properties, against certain federal officials and employees, and by members of the military. In addition, it covers certain crimes that are defined by statute as federal offenses wherever they occur, no matter who commits them, such as certain crimes of terrorism. Due to the principles of federalism embodied in the United States Constitution, federal criminal law does not apply to crimes prosecuted by the individual U.S. states, although 38 states also recognize the fetus or "unborn child" as a crime victim, at least for purposes of homicide or feticide.

The legislation was both hailed and vilified by various legal observers who interpreted the measure as a step toward granting legal personhood to human fetuses, even though the bill explicitly contained a provision excepting abortion, stating that the bill would not "be construed to permit the prosecution... of any person for conduct relating to an abortion for which the consent of the pregnant woman, or a person authorized by law to act on her behalf", "of any person for any medical treatment of the pregnant woman or her unborn child" or "of any woman with respect to her unborn child". The reluctance of a federal law to authorize federal prosecution of a particular act committed under federal jurisdiction does not prevent states from passing their own laws against the act committed under their jurisdiction. Meanwhile, the definition of all unborn babies as "members of the species homo sapiens" in section (d) says what proposed "personhood" laws say. Sponsors of such proposals say such legal language will trigger the collapse clause in Roe v. Wade, by establishing what they suggest Roe said must be established for legal abortion to end. Several state supreme courts have ruled that sections (a) through (c) are not threatened by Roe, but, by the time it was overturned by the Supreme Court, no court had ever addressed whether Roe could survive the suggested triggering of its collapse clause by section (d).

The legislation was originally advocated by Senator Lindsey Graham, then later on the legislation was introduced in the house as H.R. 1997 by Melissa Hart in May 7, 2003. The enactment of the legislation was found to be essential, since it would make it a separate offense to harm a fetus.

The legislation contained the alternate title of Laci and Conner's Law after the California mother (Laci Peterson) and fetus (Conner Peterson) whose deaths were widely publicized during the later stages of the congressional debate on the bill in 2003 and 2004. Her husband Scott Peterson was convicted of double homicide under California's fetal homicide law.

== Legislative history ==
Hearing of Unborn Victims of Violence Act in 2003

The Unborn Victims of Violence Act was first introduced in Congress in 1999 by then-Congressman (later Senator) Lindsey Graham of South Carolina. It passed the House of Representatives in 1999 and 2001, but not the Senate. In 2003, the bill was reintroduced in the House as H.R. 1997 by Rep. Melissa Hart of Pennsylvania.

Prior to enactment of the federal law, the fetus in utero was, as a general rule, not recognized as a victim of federal crimes of violence. Thus, in a federal crime that injured a pregnant woman and killed the fetus in utero, no homicide was recognized, in most cases.

=== House committee action ===
The House Judiciary Committee approved the legislation known as HR 1997 on January 31, 2003. During the debate the Committee rejected an 11–9 vote on an amendment that was to create a separate offense for federal crimes against pregnant women but without recognizing fetuses as separate entities. The Committee also rejected an 11–20 amendment to specify that nothing in the bill "shall be constructed as undermining a women's right to choose an abortion as guaranteed by the U.S. Constitution or limiting in any way the rights and freedoms of pregnant women". Furthermore, the Committee also rejected by voice vote two amendments in which would have directed the federal sentencing commission to amend sentencing guidelines for crimes that injury or death to a pregnant women and a rejection against deleting language in the bill that would have allowed convictions in cases where prosecutors did not show a defendant knew the victim or had the intention to cause death or injury to a fetus.

=== House floor action ===
The House passed the bill 254–163 on February 26, 2004. Prior to this, the House rejected a substitute that did not include language that defined an "unborn child". This would have also required that the defendant to be convicted of a federal crime against a pregnant woman prior to receiving additional consequences for harming a fetus. The legislation was co-sponsored by 136 other members of the House before it passed by a vote of 254 in favor to 163 against on February 26, 2004.

=== Senate Floor Action ===
The senate cleared the House Bill, 61-38, on March 25, 2004 after the Republicans succeeded in defeating two Democratic amendments. Bill Frist, majority leader, attempted to acknowledge a similar legislation to the Senate floor in July 2003 prohibiting amendments, but the Democratic party objected. After several amendments were rejected, it was passed in the Senate by a vote of 61–38 on March 25, 2004. Following the Senate hearing, President George W. Bush signed the bill, which then became law on April 1, 2004.

Date	Legislative action
January 13, 2003	Introduced in Senate
May 7, 2003	Introduced in House
July 8, 2003	Unborn Victims of Violence Act of 2003 or Laci and Conner's Law; Subcommittee on Constitution, Committee on Judiciary. House
February 11, 2004	Laci and Conner's Law; Committee on the Judiciary. House
February 24, 2004	Providing for Consideration of H.R. 1997, Unborn Victims of Violence Act of 2004; Committee on Rules. House
February 25, 2004	House agreement to H. Res 529
February 26, 2004	House consideration and passage of H.R. 1997
March 25, 2004	Senate consideration and passage of H.R. 1997
April 1, 2004	Enacted. Congress 108-2 and signed by President George W. Bush

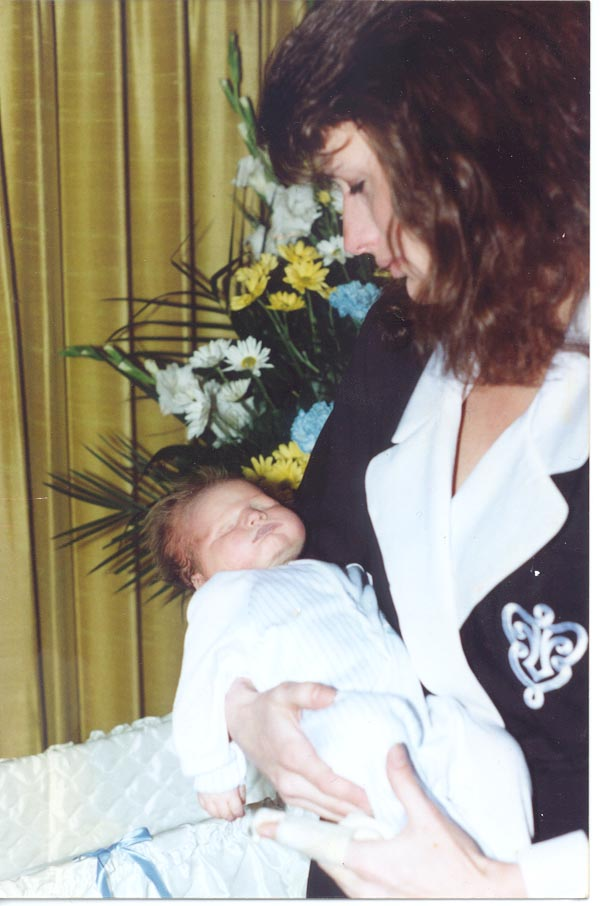
A February 1992 photo of Tracy Marciniak, holding the body of her son Zachariah. Marciniak was seriously injured, and Zachariah was killed, by an assault during the ninth month of the pregnancy. This photo was on display as Marciniak testified at a televised hearing in favor of the Unborn Victims of Violence Act before a subcommittee of the Committee on the Judiciary, U.S. House of Representatives, on July 8, 2003. It was also displayed, in poster size, on the floors of the U.S. House and U.S. Senate during the subsequent debates on the legislation.

== Signing ==
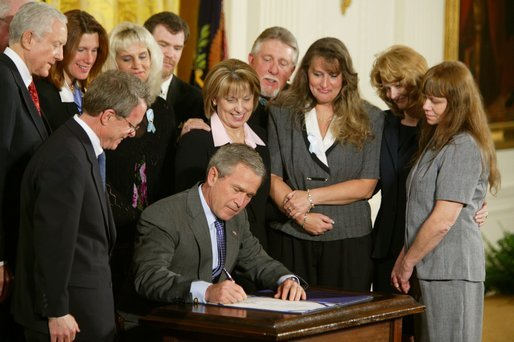
Signing ceremony at the White House, April 1, 2004

At the signing ceremony, the President was joined on stage by men and women who had lost family members in two-victim crimes, including Laci Peterson's mother, Sharon Rocha. During his remarks at the ceremony, Bush said, "Any time an expectant mother is a victim of violence, two lives are in the balance, each deserving protection, and each deserving justice. If the crime is murder and the unborn child's life ends, justice demands a full accounting under the law."

== Support ==
Anti-abortion organizations strongly supported the act. On July 3, 2003, the U.S. Judiciary Committee heard testimony for and against passage of the UVVA. Feminists for Life president Serrin Foster submitted her own testimony, as well as that of Sharon Rocha. In addition, Foster argued against passage of an alternative bill by Rep. Zoe Lofgren, which would have provided "additional punishment for certain crimes against women when the crimes cause an interruption in the normal course of their pregnancies" but not treated the unborn child as a second victim. Foster said: "We are asking our elected representatives to honestly answer the question in the case of Laci Peterson and baby Conner. Was there one victim or two? Those who support the single-victim substitute would deny women justice."

== Opposition ==
The Unborn Victims of Violence Act was strongly opposed by most abortion-rights organizations, on grounds that the U.S. Supreme Court's Roe v. Wade decision said that the human fetus is not a "person" under the Fourteenth Amendment to the U.S. Constitution, and that if the fetus were a Fourteenth Amendment "person", then they would have a constitutional right to life. The laws of 38 states also recognize the human fetus as the legal victim of homicide and often, other violent crimes during the entire period of prenatal development (27 states) or during part of the prenatal period (nine states). Legal challenges to these laws, arguing that they violate Roe v. Wade or other Supreme Court precedents, have been uniformly rejected by both the federal and the state courts, including the supreme courts of California, Pennsylvania, and Minnesota.

Senator John Kerry, who was the Democratic nominee in the 2004 presidential election, voted against the bill, saying, "I have serious concerns about this legislation because the law cannot simultaneously provide that a fetus is a human being and protect the right of the mother to choose to terminate her pregnancy."

Some prominent legal scholars who strongly support Roe v. Wade, such as Walter Dellinger of Duke University Law School, Richard Parker of Harvard, and Sherry F. Colb of Rutgers Law School, have written that fetal homicide laws do not conflict with Roe v. Wade.

A principle that allows language in law to not conflict with Roe, which logically should trigger Roe's "collapse" clause, was explained in Webster v. Reproductive Health Services, 492 US 490 (1989). Until such language becomes the basis for laws that specify penalties for abortion, the issue is not even before the court, of whether or not such language conflicts with Roe, and if so, which should be struck down.

Representative Jerrold Nadler made a statement in voicing his opposition to a proposed federal law giving prenatal entities certain legal rights. The bill appears to contradict an important premise behind the constitutional right to seek an abortion: prenatal entities are not persons.

== Provisions ==
The Unborn Victims of Violence Act of 2004 protects unborn infants against violence and murder, and any individual responsible for the death or harm of a child in utero is charged separately from the offense towards the pregnant woman.

The operative portion of the law, now codified as Title 18, Section 1841 of the United States Code, reads as follows:

=== Section 1841: protection of unborn children ===
Anyone who participates in activity that violates any of the provisions of law and causes the death or bodily harm as defined in section 1365 of a child who is in utero at the time the conduct occurs is guilty of a separate crime under this section. Provides that persons who commit certain Federal violent crimes conduct that violates specified provisions of the Federal criminal code, the Controlled Substances Act of 1970, or the Atomic Energy Act of 1954, or specified articles of the Uniform Code of Military Justice and thereby cause the death of, or bodily injury to, a child who is in utero shall be guilty of a separate offense.

- protection of unborn children which describes that any harm to a child in utero is an offense
- the punishment is the same for the conduct occurring to the unborn child’s mother. Requires the punishment for that separate offense to be the same as provided under Federal law for that conduct had that injury or death occurred to the unborn child's mother
- It is not necessary to show that the offender meant to damage the unborn child or that they knew or should have known that the victim of the underlying conduct was pregnant
- A person cannot be prosecuted under this Act for:
  - engaging in conduct related to an abortion for which the pregnant woman's consent has been obtained or is implied by law;
  - engaging in conduct related to the pregnant woman's or her unborn child's medical treatment.

=== Section 919a ===
- The law is enforced for any individual who causes death or injury of an unborn child in the utero at the time the conduct takes place, is to be guilty of a separate offense.
- Bars prosecution: of any person for conduct relating to an abortion for which the consent of the pregnant woman (or a person authorized by law to act on her behalf) has been obtained or is implied by law or for conduct relating to any medical treatment of the pregnant woman or her unborn child.

== See also ==
- Born alive rule
- Fetal rights
- Feticide
- Murder of pregnant women
