= Quickening =

Moment in pregnancy when the mother starts to feel movement in the uterus

In pregnancy terms, quickening is the moment in pregnancy when the mother starts to feel the fetus's movement in her uterus. It was believed in Aristotelian and Thomistic tradition that the quickening was associated with the moment that a soul entered the fetus, termed ensoulment, and that this took place at approximately the 40th day in males and the 80th day in females. Many legal and cultural traditions treated quickening, either as felt by the mother or inferred by the duration of the pregnancy, as a key boundary in the status of the fetus.

== Medical facts ==
The first natural sensation of quickening may feel like a light tapping or fluttering. These sensations eventually become stronger and more regular as the pregnancy progresses. Sometimes, the first movements are mis-attributed to gas or hunger pangs.

A woman's uterine muscles, rather than her abdominal muscles, are first to sense fetal motion. Therefore, her body weight usually does not have a substantial effect on when movements are initially perceived. Women who have previously given birth have more relaxed uterine muscles which are more sensitive to fetal motion during subsequent pregnancies. For them fetal motion can sometimes be felt as early as 14 weeks.

Quickening indicates the start of fetal movements, usually felt 14–26 weeks after conception, or between the fourth and sixth month. A woman pregnant for the first time (i.e., a primigravida woman) typically feels fetal movements at about 20–21 weeks, whereas a woman who has given birth at least once will typically feel movements around 18 weeks.

== Common law ==
The study of the early history of common law in the context of the abortion debate presents some challenges. Over the years dedicated scholars have uncovered case law that supports the argument that abortion was considered murder, in at least some cases, even before quickening. However, due to the greater impact of local customs and contested jurisdictions in earlier stages of legal history, the customary origins of the common law are murky, and scholars can point to other cases where abortion was not considered such a serious matter.

The first legal writer to describe abortion of a quick fetus as homicide was Henry de Bracton in the early 13th century:

If one strikes a pregnant woman or gives her poison in order to procure an abortion, if the fetus is already formed or quickened, especially if it is quickened, he commits homicide.

The fetal right to life post-quickening was recognized by the 18th century British legal scholar William Blackstone as a legally protected right "inherent by nature in every individual". Blackstone wrote that life became a legally protected right "as soon as an infant is able to stir in the mother's womb". Blackstone explained the subject of quickening in the eighteenth century, relative to feticide and abortion:

Life... begins in contemplation of law as soon as an infant is able to stir in the mother's womb. For if a woman is quick with child, and by a potion, or otherwise, killeth it in her womb; or if any one beat her, whereby the child dieth in her body, and she is delivered of a dead child; this, though not murder, was by the ancient law homicide or manslaughter. But at present it is not looked upon in quite so atrocious a light, though it remains a very heinous misdemeanor.

Blackstone's Commentaries and other widely consulted common law authorities drew a dividing line at quickening analogous to the viability line the Supreme Court attempted to draw in Roe v. Wade.

In England in the seventeenth through nineteenth centuries, a woman convicted of a capital crime could claim a delay in her execution if she were pregnant; a woman who did so was said to "plead the belly". The law held that no women could be granted a second reprieve from the original sentence on the ground of subsequent pregnancy, even if the fetus had quickened. In Ireland on 16 March 1831 Baron Pennefather in Limerick stated that pregnancy was not alone sufficient for a delay but there had to be quickening.

== See also ==
- Abortion in the United States § History
