= Live birth (human) =

Fetus exits womb with sign of life

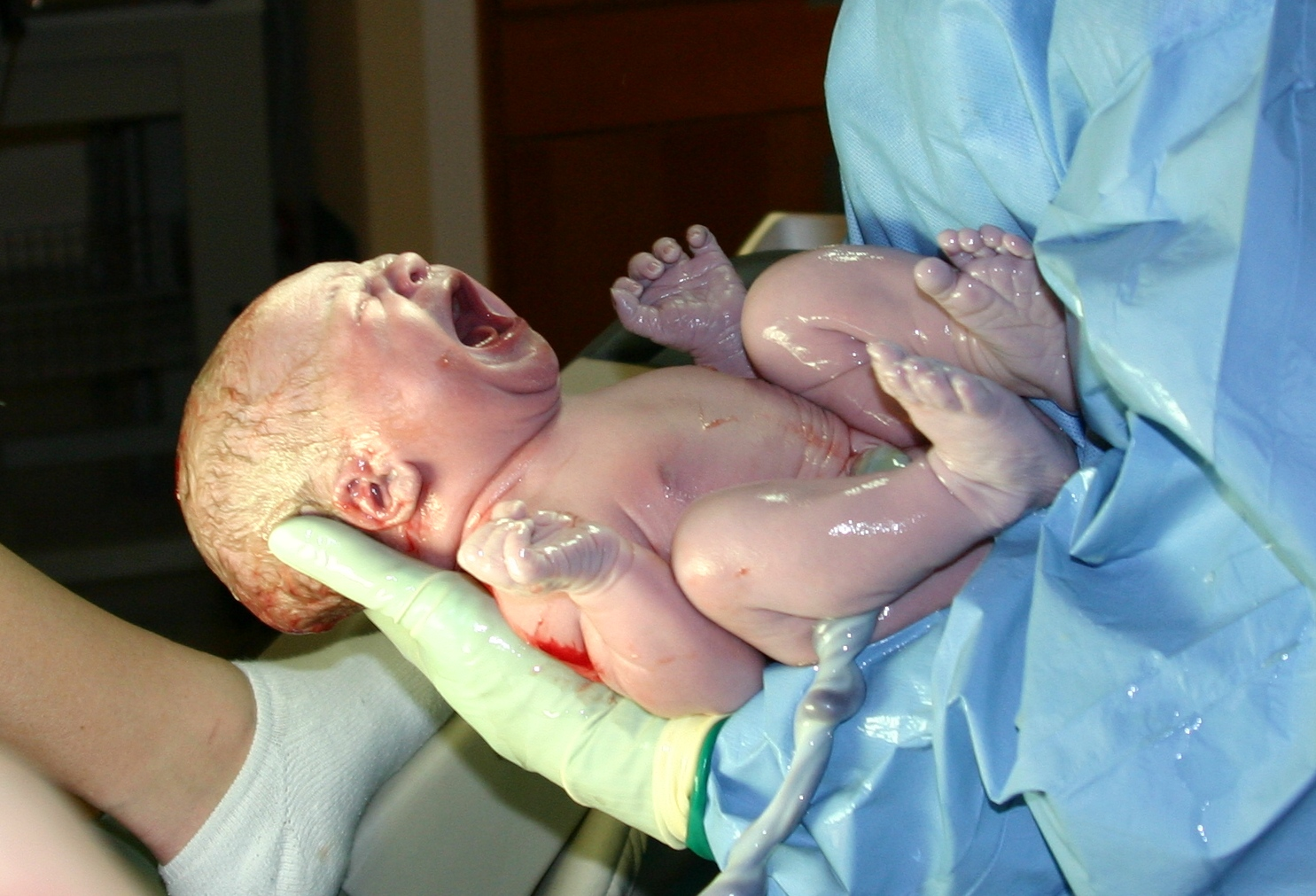
Crying newborn

In human reproduction, a live birth occurs when a fetus exits a pregnant woman showing any definite sign of life, such as voluntary movement, heartbeat or pulsation of the umbilical cord, for however brief a time, and regardless of whether the umbilical cord or placenta are intact. After the fetus leaves the womb it is called a neonate. It is a "live birth" whether the birth is vaginal or by caesarean section, and whether the neonate is ultimately viable.

The definition of the term "live birth" was created by the World Health Organization in 1950, and is chiefly used for public health and statistical purposes. However, the term "live birth" was in common use long before 1950.

In the United States, the term "born alive" is defined by federal law known as the born alive rule. Live births are recorded on a U.S. Standard Certificate of Live Birth, also known as a birth certificate. The United States recorded 3,605,201 live births in 2020 which is a 4% decrease from 2019 and the 6th consecutive year of decline in births.

Not all pregnancies result in live births. Pregnancy can be terminated artificially through abortion. The natural death of an embryo or fetus before it is able to survive independently is termed miscarriage or pregnancy loss. Some use the cutoff of 20 weeks of gestation for miscarriage, after which fetal death is known as stillbirth. The death of the fetus or neonate at the end of the pregnancy, during labour and delivery, or just after birth, is counted as perinatal mortality.

== Factors affecting viability ==
=== Gestational age ===
Measured in weeks, gestational age is a term used to describe how far along a pregnancy is starting from the first day of the woman's last menstrual cycle to the current date. A baby born "at term" is between the gestational age of 37 weeks to 41 weeks. A preterm baby is born before the gestational age of 37 weeks. A pregnancy that lasts 41 weeks up to 42 weeks is called late-term and a pregnancy longer than 42 weeks is called post-term. The general consensus is that a fetus is viable at 24 weeks, however, a live birth may occur earlier in gestation with the assistance from neonatal intensive care unit (NICU) resources. Gestational age is the main determinant of whether a baby will be able to live and survive outside of the uterus.

=== Other factors ===
While gestational age is the most significant predictor of fetal viability, the condition of the neonate at birth also significantly indicates how well it tolerates life outside the mother. Factors measured at birth include birth weight, head circumference, and body length. An Apgar score is given at the time of birth to report the status of the newborn infant and the response to resuscitation if needed.

== Recovery ==
The maternal recovery period directly following the events of human childbirth, regardless of whether it is a live birth, is called the postpartum period.

== Special cases ==
There is one case report of a woman having a live birth derived from a frozen embryo obtained before she began cancer treatment.

== See also ==
- Childbirth
- Maternal death
