= Gender disappointment =

Unmet desire for a child of a preferred sex

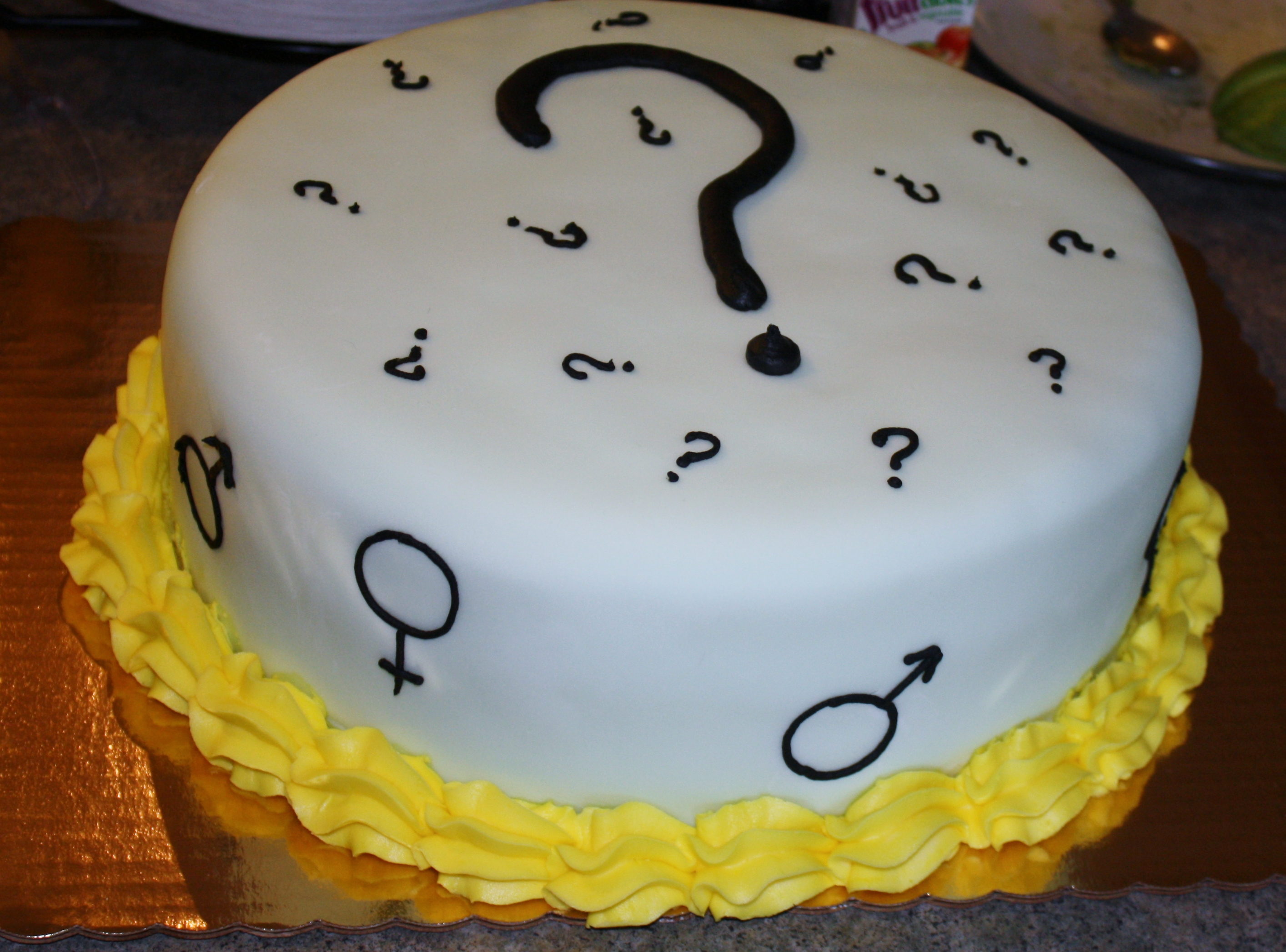
A cake for a gender reveal party. Gender disappointment might reveal itself at one of these parties.

Gender disappointment is the feeling of sadness parents experience when the desire for a child of a preferred sex is not met. It can create feelings of shame which cannot always be expressed openly. It is often noticed in cultures where women are viewed as of a lower status and the preferred choice is for a male infant, i.e. son preference. It may result in sex-selective killing, or the neglection of female children.

Gender disappointment can occur before or after giving birth. It has been questioned whether it can be considered a unique mental illness or whether it should be linked to other mental disorders, like depression (e.g. postpartum depression) or adjustment disorders. Its treatment can be complex since a particular pathway to recovery has not yet been defined. Nonetheless, there are some treatments available that have been shown to be successful.

== Theories ==
A number of theories exist via which gender disappointment is generally explained: the gender discrimination theory, the gender essentialism theory and the parental investment theory.

=== Gender discrimination theory ===
This theory suggests that a patriarchal kinship system, prevalent in Asian countries, generates a strong preference for a certain gender, in casu a son. Such a system considers sons as "harbingers of prosperity and daughters as liabilities who require significant outlay of resources through their lifetime". In such a society, the underlying pressures to have a male child are vast. They range from social and cultural pressures (e.g. only sons will propagate the family name, certain religious rites can only be performed by men) to economic considerations (e.g. sons have the obligation to take care of the economic situation of their parents in their older days) and safety concerns.

=== Gender essentialism theory ===
Gender essentialism is the theory according to which intrinsic qualities are attributed to men and women treating them as of a fixed essence. Often, they are defined in terms of individual biological capacities but they can also be grounded in social stereotypes.

When the parental desire for a child of a specific gender is grounded in such stereotypes (whether descriptive or prescriptive), gender-related biases can cause and reinforce gender disappointment.

While gender essentialism may play a role in certain cultures, it contradicts with recent views that gender is a complex construct influenced by biological factors and environmental circumstances.

=== The parental investment theory ===
In evolutionary theory, parental investment is any expenditure that benefits offspring and can potentially increase its chances of survival. This includes money spendings on essential and non-essential goods, time spendings on activities, and attention and energy spendings. It causes parents to engage in a cost-benefit analysis and to compare spendings between their children. Research shows that for example in countries like India, parents are more likely to allocate resources, such as time and money, to their sons rather than to their daughters resulting in better access to vaccination and healthcare.

== Personal factors ==
Gender disappointment cannot only be explained by reference to the general theories mentioned above. Several personal factors can contribute to being more or less prone to feelings of disappointment in relation to gender:

1. The parent's age: Parents between the age of 19 and 25 are more inclined to experience gender disappointment. As people get older, their desire for having a child exceeds the desire for having a child of a specific gender due to the increased chance of infertility.
2. The parent's gender: Females experience gender disappointment more given the volatility of their hormonal levels which can also result in other mental disorders during the postpartum period, such as depression.
3. The parent's personality: A clear link has been established between gender disappointment and the characteristics of a parent's personality. Tied back to the psychological theory of The Big Five Personality traits, research suggests that neuroticism, extraversion, and conscientiousness are moderators for gender disappointment. For example, extroverted people are sociable and will expect a gender that will bring them more public attention. They will be disappointed if this is not the case. Conscientious individuals, for instance, like to plan and think ahead: this may result in disappointment when the unexpected gender is born.

== Solutions and treatment ==
Dealing with gender disappointment can take place on a personal level and via professional help. Ultimately, long-term solutions should be sought on a social level.

=== Personal level ===
Opening up, in group or one-to-one, and sharing the negative emotions resulting from gender disappointment, can help reduce the feelings of shame.

=== Professional help ===
Professional treatment in the context of gender disappointment generally exists in counseling which helps parents to understand that the sex of their offspring does not determine their parenting experience. It faces some unique challenges due to the level of subjectivity that comes with any mental disorder on the one hand and the existing social stigma on the other hand. As a result, treatments for gender disappointment are not always easily accessible.

=== Social level ===
Most studies indicate that the long-term solutions are not to be found on an individual level but on a social level. They highlight that sexism should be recognised within societies as a social disorder and that sexist social structures should be dismantled.

== See also ==
- Daughter preference
- Antenatal depression
- Gendercide
- Postpartum depression
- Psychiatric disorders of childbirth
- Son preference
- Female infanticide
- Neonaticide
- Female infanticide in India
- Female infanticide in Pakistan
- Female infanticide in China
- Female Infanticide Prevention Act, 1870
