= Doodh peeti =

Female infanticide method

Doodh peeti was a method of female infanticide in which newborn girls were drowned in pails or pits of cow milk (doodh). It is the British government who found that in Rajasthan, the people were dipping and drowning newborn girls in milk until they died. The practice was prevalent in the Saurashtra and Kutch region of India. The phrase is a euphemism literally meaning "feeding of milk".

== History ==
During a census in 1805, the British officials found almost no girls in Jadeja Rajput families of the Kutch and Kathiawar regions. The 11th edition of the Encyclopædia Britannica (1910) noted under the topic Infanticide that this method, although forbidden by the Vedas of Hinduism, was practiced by some Rajputs to avoid paying dowry later. It noted that Rajahs sometimes paid over £100,000 as a dowry. The British resident in Baroda Colonel Walker, insisted on banning the practice while signing pacts with the local Rajputs. The practice however continued until the late 19th century.

== See also ==
- Kuri-mar
- Female infanticide in India
