= Female infanticide in Pakistan =

Deliberate killing of female newborns in Pakistan

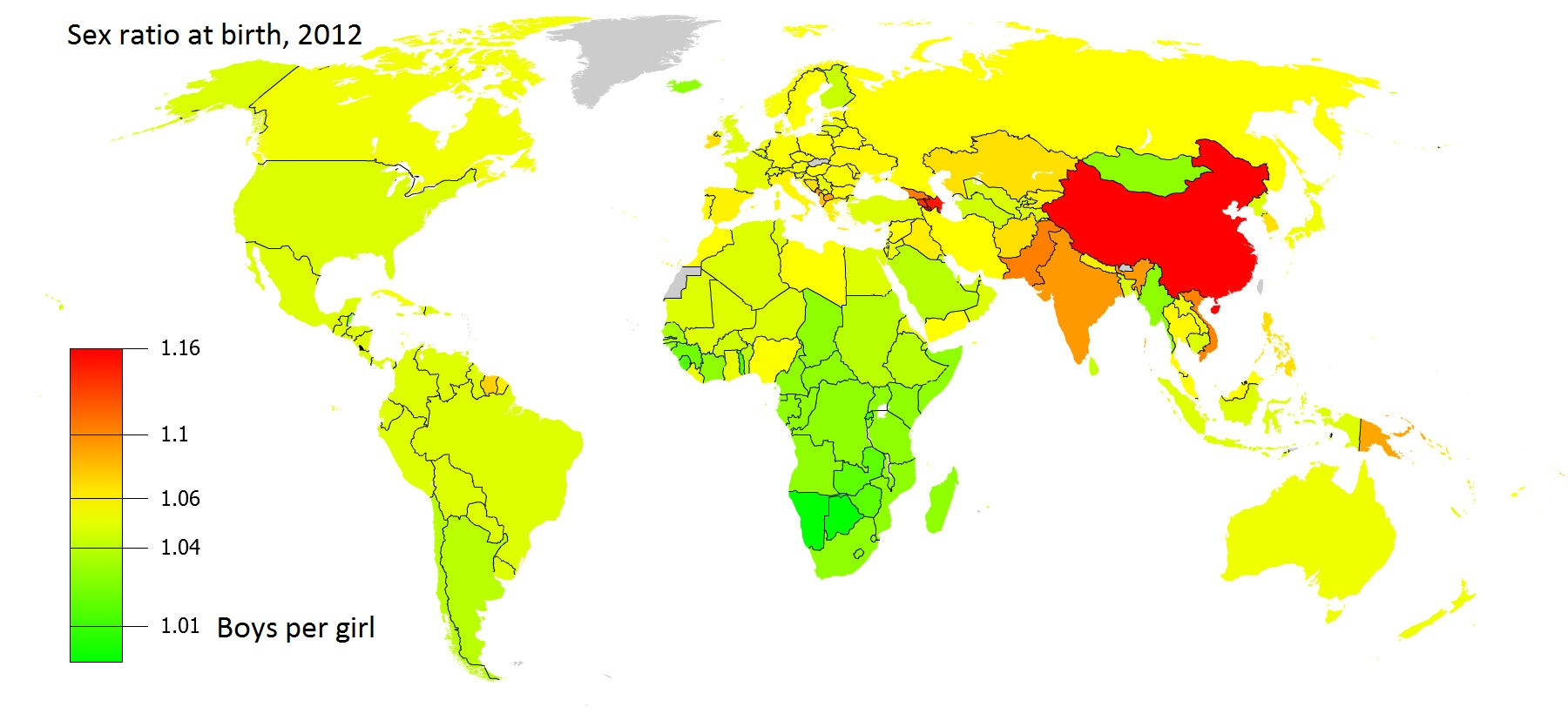
World map of birth sex ratios, 2012

Female infanticide has long been a common practice in Pakistan due to a number of cultural factors. Official statistics show the rate of infant mortality has been decreasing, but these numbers would not include infanticide, which is rarely reported and even more rarely investigated.

== History ==
During the 19th century in British India, one-fourth of the population preserved only half its daughters, while the remaining three-quarters of the population had a balanced sex ratio with 118 males per 100 females. This is comparable to the late 20th century sex ratio in the region, now divided between India and Pakistan.

Among Kharal people, female infanticide was common. A report from 1884 states:

The Kharrals are the most northerly of the great Ravi tribes, occupying a great portion of the land between Gugera and the Lahore district on both sides of the river, and extending some distance into the Gujranwala district. The Kharrals were Rajputs... and never got on with each other. The feuds of the Lakheras and upper Ravi Kharrals have been noticed. The tragic adventure of Mirza and Sahiban is said to have been the cause of desperate quarrels. Mirza was a Kharral of the Sahi muhin... went as a boy to Khewa in Jhang, where he fell in love with his cousin Sahiban, the daughter of the chief man of the place. Her parents betrothed her to a youth of the Chadar tribe, but before the marriage could place, Mirza ran away with her. He was pursued and slain. Her relations strangled Sahiban... These murders were cause of such bloody feuds between the clans that it at the length was thought inauspicious to have daughters, and as soon as they were born, they were strangled as Sahiban had been. This custom of female infanticide was common among the Kharrals till Colonel Hamilton, Commissioner of Multan, persuaded them to discontinue it.

This report is cited in a 2010 book on son preference, giving the context of the Mirza Sahiban tragic romance, and putting the practice in a wider socio-economic analysis.

== Son preference ==
Similarly to other countries in South Asia, Pakistani households have a strong preference for sons. Parent fertility remains incomplete until and unless the desired number of boys are born. Son preference prevails in rural areas, due to male inheritance of agricultural land, and males being seen as better suited to work the land. Boys are often given better access to resources, healthcare, and education. Prenatal sex-selection is more common among the upper classes who have access to medical care and technology, while abuse after birth (infanticide and abandonment) is more common among the lower classes. Girls who are unwanted are often forced into early marriage. Son preference has effect on the status of Pakistani women. Women bearing at least one son have higher say in household decision-making. According to Pakistani surveys and statistics, Pakistan has witnessed 40 million abortion of female children in the past 50 years.

== Dowry ==
Families often do not want daughters because they are expected to pay dowry upon their marriage. The giving and expectation of a dowry is part of the culture, with most marriages in every region of Pakistan involving transfer of a dowry from the bride's family to a groom's family. Conflicts related to dowry often lead to violence. At over 2000 dowry-related deaths per year, and annual rates exceeding 2.45 deaths per 100,000 women from dowry-related violence, Pakistan has the highest reported number of dowry death rates per 100,000 women in the world. Dowries exist across all levels of Pakistani society as it is an issue of honor for the bridegroom and his family. Brides who do not meet the dowry expectations of in-laws are often humiliated and physically abused. In some cases brides have been killed.

== Culture of family honor ==
Pakistan has a strong 'culture of honor', where a female can easily tarnish the 'honor' and 'reputation' of her family through certain behaviors (often related to chastity), whether these behaviors are real or suspected by the community. The family honor is an abstract concept involving the perceived quality of worthiness and respectability that affects the social standing and the self-evaluation of a group of related people, both corporately and individually. The family is viewed as the main source of honor and the community highly values the relationship between honor and the family. The conduct of family members reflects upon family honor and the way the family perceives itself, and is perceived by others. Honor killings in Pakistan are known locally as karo-kari. An honor killing is the homicide of a member of a family or social group by other members, due to the belief the victim has brought dishonour upon the family or community. The death of the victim is viewed as a way to restore the reputation and honour of the family. In order to avoid such problems related to the honor culture, families reject altogether the idea of having daughters.

== Sex selective abortion ==
Sex-selective abortion—the practice of terminating a pregnancy based on the female sex of the fetus—occurs in Pakistan, although it is illegal. Abortion is generally prohibited in Pakistan, except when necessary to preserve the life or health of the pregnant woman.

Between January 2017 and April 2018, the Edhi Foundation and the Chhipa Welfare Foundation discovered numerous cases of infanticide in various cities. In Karachi, these organizations found 345 newborns dumped in the garbage and 99 percent of them were girls. Local authorities attributed the practice to poverty and cultural customs that favor sons over daughters. However, findings in Karachi suggest that many female infants were also killed due to the influence of local Islamic clerics who ordered that babies born out of wedlock be discarded. Babies born out of wedlock in Islam are considered a sin.

"We have been dealing with such cases for years and there are a few such incidents which shook our souls as much. It left us wondering whether our society is heading back to primitive age," Edhi Foundation senior manager Anwar Kazmi told The News International.

== Prevalence ==
According to one estimate from the end of the 20th century, about 3.1 million girls are missing in Pakistan. The extent to which this is attributable to infanticide is contested; see Missing women of Asia.

In 1998, 391 infant girls were found dead, about 68 in 1999, 59 in 2000, 51 in 2001, and 39 in 2002. The number of infanticides, particularly of girls, is on the increase, according to the Edhi Foundation. They know of 890 newborns killed in 2008, 999 in 2009 and about 1,210 in 2010, and this counts only the large cities.

== See also ==
- Female infanticide in China
- Female infanticide in India
- Family planning in Pakistan
- Sex-selective abortion
- Women in Pakistan
