= It's a Girl: The Three Deadliest Words in the World =

2012 documentary film about female infanticide

It's a Girl: The Three Deadliest Words in the World is a 2012 documentary film which explores the practice of female infanticide. It was directed by Evan Grae Davis and focused primarily on India and China. The United Nations has estimated that up to 200 million females are "missing" today, most of whom would have lived in India and China. The film took four years to shoot.

The documentary opens in India, the scene is of a woman standing in a field, who is explaining that she had killed eight of her newborns by strangulation as they were female. Davis had initially set out to create a documentary on sex trafficking and on women being exploited. Having listened to the story from the Indian woman, Davis switched direction, scrapping his first idea, and instead created a documentary with the sole focus being gendercide. Davis focused on China and female infanticide in India, as cultural norms, combined with such cultural practices as India's dowry system and China's one-child policy, have an important role in the practice.

Evan Grae Davis has worked for the Harvest Media Ministry, an organization that makes pro-life videos for church groups.

== Filming and production ==
In the documentary, Davis interviewed social workers, women in rural communities and activists. He found that the primary cause for the practice was poverty, but also that the cultural norms which lead to a male being more highly valued than a female played an important factor. In these societies the males are the providers for the family, and daughters have to be married off with a dowry which many cannot afford. This in turn leads to a "culture of death". Forced abortion in China is common, with one part of the documentary being on women who have to flee from periodic sweeps by police enforcing the one child law. Because of the shortage of women, human trafficking has risen sharply in China, and one interview in the documentary is of a woman whose daughter was kidnapped and then sold as a slave.

Davis has said that it was exceptionally difficult in China to get women to go on film. He did, however, meet a factory worker named Li Fang who was willing to share her story. After the police discovered she was pregnant for a third time, they raided her home. She and her husband had to flee their village and she gave birth in secret. Their daughter is deemed "illegal", and therefore cannot get education or health care, or work legally.

In India, Davis interviewed pediatrician Dr. Mitu Khurana. When she found she was pregnant she was forced to undergo an ultrasound by her husband and mother-in-law. As with the dowry system, testing for gender is illegal in India with the application of parental sex discernment in 1994, as the method was being used for sex-selective abortion. When the ultrasound showed Khurana was pregnant with twin girls, her husband and mother in law asked her to terminate the pregnancy. She refused, and as a result her husband threw her down the stairs and then locked her up. She managed to get away, and had her children two months early. She has since campaigned to have her husband, as well as the doctor who carried out the illegal ultrasound arrested, but charges have never been brought.

It is estimated that there are 37 million more males than females in China. The documentary also looks into the ever-increasing rate of female suicide in China, it explores the connection between suicide and the low value placed on females due to cultural norms. The Chinese government has recently said it would begin to phase out the one child policy, which may help reduce female infanticide in China. However, according to the documentary, cultural values also need to change so that families are as happy having a daughter as they are having a son.

== Screenings ==
The documentary has been screened at Amnesty International's seventh Amnesty Reel Awareness Film Festival in Toronto, and at the European Parliament in Brussels. Human rights journalist Ram Mashru, who worked with Davis to raise awareness of the issue, took part in a Q&A after two student societies at the University of Oxford, Lawyers Without Borders and Women for Women International, screened the documentary at the Saskatchewan Theatre in Exeter College, Oxford.

== See also ==
- Female foeticide in India
- Female infanticide in China
- Female infanticide in India

== Bibliography ==
- DeLugan, Robin Maria (2013). "Exposing Gendercide in India and China (Davis, Brown, and Denier's It's a Girl—the Three Deadliest Words in the World)". Current Anthropology. 54 (5). University of Chicago Press: 649–650. doi:10.1086/672365. JSTOR 10.1086/672365. S2CID 142658205.
- Harmon, A. G. (18 October 2012). "The Three Deadliest Words in the World: It's a Girl". Patheos.
- Izri, Touria (14 November 2012). "It's a girl documentary explores gendercide in China and India". The Star. Archived from the original on 31 July 2013.
- Lu, Angela (28 June 2013). "Millions missing". World.
- Mashru, Ram (18 January 2012). "It's a girl: The three deadliest words in the world". The Independent. Archived from the original on 12 December 2013.
- Mashru, Ram (24 January 2013). "Film Screening: 'It's A Girl: The Three Deadliest Words in the World'". University of Oxford. Archived from the original on 4 March 2016.
- Rajpal, Roma (30 January 2013). "'It's a girl'". Deutsche Welle.
- Virk, Zakaria (15 November 2012). "It's a girl – 3 deadliest words in the world". The Muslim Times.

== Further information ==
- Female infanticide by Webster University
- Film on Amazon Prime
