= Female infanticide in China =

China has a history of female infanticide which spans 2,000 years. When Christian missionaries arrived in China in the late sixteenth century, they witnessed newborns being thrown into rivers or onto rubbish piles. In the seventeenth century Matteo Ricci documented that the practice occurred in several of China's provinces and said that the primary reason for the practice was poverty. The practice continued into the 19th century and declined precipitously after the proclamation of the People's Republic of China, but reemerged as an issue after the PRC government introduced the one-child policy in the early 1980s. The 2020 census showed a male-to-female ratio of 105.07 to 100 for mainland China, a record low since the People's Republic of China (PRC) began conducting censuses.

== History ==
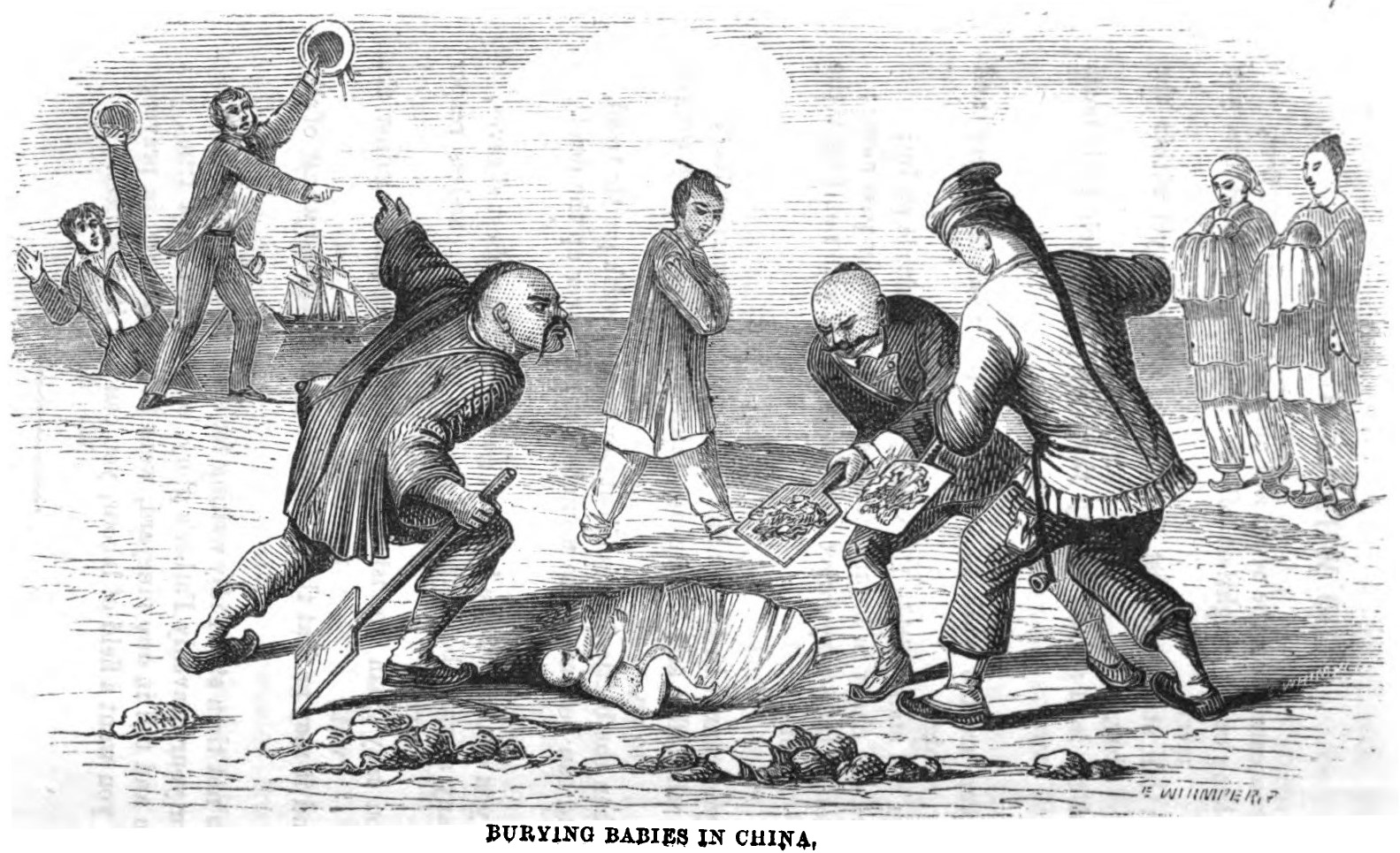
Burying Babies in China (p.40, March 1865, XXII)

Confucianism has an influence on female infanticide in China. The fact that male children work to provide for their elderly and that certain traditions are male-driven lead many to believe they are more desirable.

In Chinese folk religion, there was no moral condemnation of infanticide or abortion.

=== 19th century ===
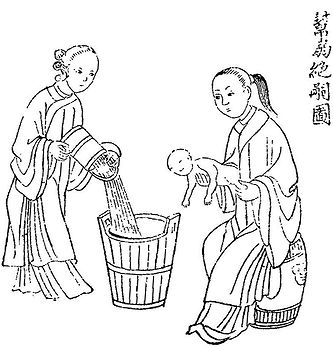
Chinese anti-infanticide tract circa 1800

During the 19th century, the practice was widespread. Readings from Qing texts show a prevalence of the term ni nü (to drown girls), and drowning was the most common method used to kill female children. Other methods used were suffocation and starvation. (Note: "As soon as the little girls are born, they are plunged into the water in order to drown them, or force is applied to their bodies in order to suffocate them or they are strangled with human hands. And something even more deplorable is that there are servants who place the girl in the chamber pot or in the basin used for the birth, which is still filled with water and blood, and, shut away there, they die miserably. And what is even more monstrous is that if the mother is not cruel enough to take the life of her daughter, then her father-in-law, mother-in-law, or husband agitates her by their words to kill the girl.") Exposure to the elements was another method: the child would be placed in a basket which was then placed in a tree. Buddhist nunneries created "baby towers" for people to leave a child. In 1845, in the province of Jiangxi, a missionary wrote that these children survived for up to two days while exposed to the elements and that those passing by would ignore the screaming child. Missionary David Abeel reported in 1844 that between one-fourth and one-third of all female children were killed at birth or soon after.

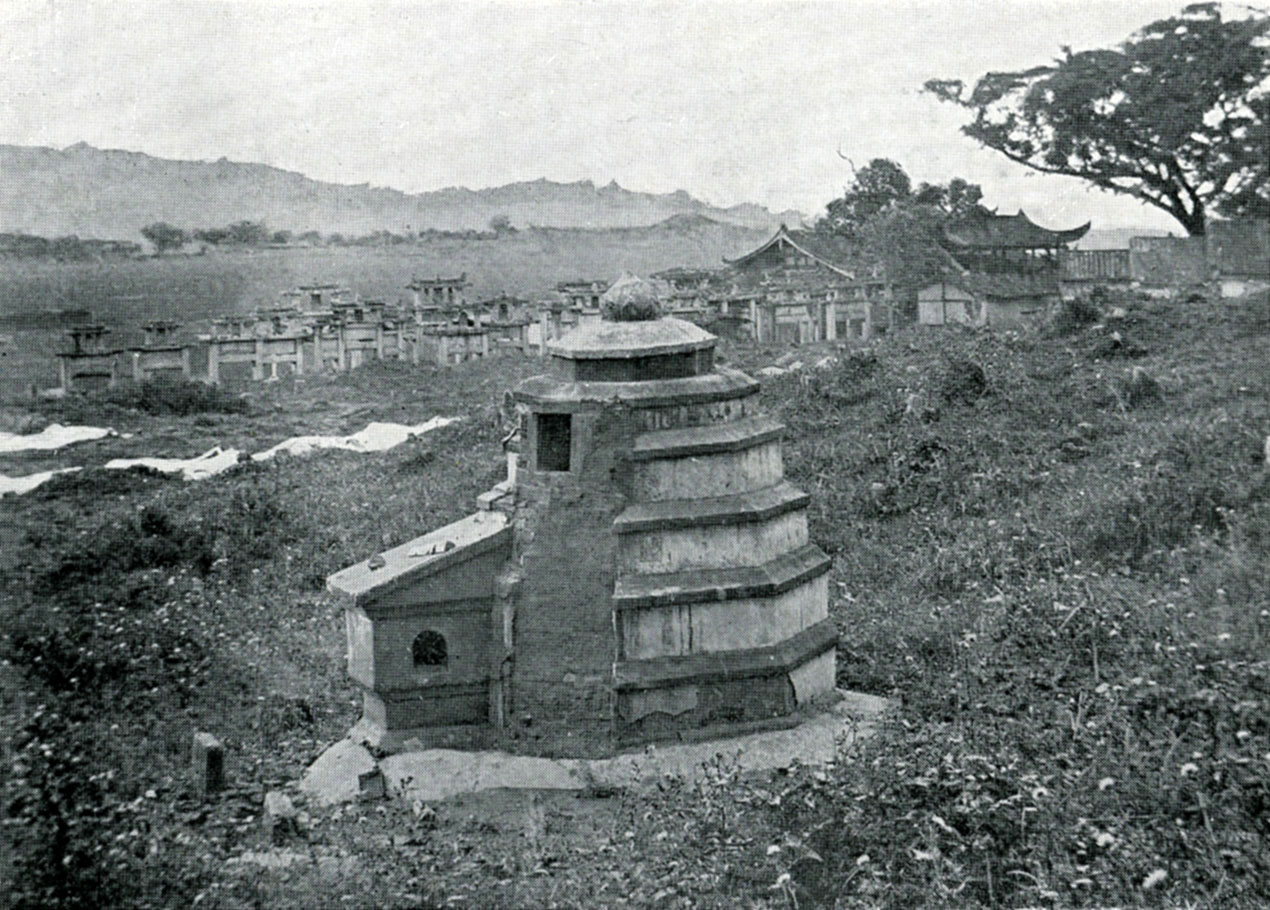
Baby Tower in Fujian Province

In 1878 French Jesuit missionary, Gabriel Palatre, collated documents from 13 provinces and the Annales de la Sainte-Enfance (Annals of the Holy Childhood), also found evidence of infanticide in Shanxi and Sichuan. According to the information collected by Palatre the practice was more widespread in the southeastern provinces and the Lower Yangzi River region.

=== 20th century ===
The Qing Code did not prohibit infanticide.

In 1930, Rou Shi, a noted member of the May Fourth Movement, wrote the short story A Slave-Mother. In it he portrayed the extreme poverty in rural communities that was a direct cause of female infanticide.

The People's Republic of China's Marriage Law of 1950 prohibited infanticide. Infanticide declined quickly during the Mao era.

==== One-Child Policy ====
In Chinese society, most parents preferred having sons, so in 1979 when the government created the One-Child Policy, baby girls were aborted or abandoned. If parents had more than one child they would be fined. The earning potential of the male heir compared to a female made parents believe that having female children would be an economic hardship, making female infanticide a more desirable solution.

A white paper published by the Chinese government in 1980 stated that the practice of female infanticide was a "feudalistic evil". (Note: "Infanticide through drowning and abandoning female babies is an evil custom left over from feudal times.") The state officially considers the practice a carryover from feudal times, not a result of the state's one-child policy. According to Jing-Bao Nie, it would be "inconceivable" to believe there is "no link" between the state's family planning policies and female infanticide.

On September 25, 1980, in an "open letter", the Politburo of the Chinese Communist Party requested that members of the party, and those in the Communist Youth League, lead by example and have only one child. From the beginning of the one-child policy, there were concerns that it would lead to an imbalance in the sex ratio. Early in the 1980s, senior officials became increasingly concerned with reports of abandonment and female infanticide by parents desperate for a son. In 1984, the government attempted to address the issue by adjusting the one-child policy. Couples whose first child is a girl are allowed to have a second child. Even when exceptions were made to the One-Child Policy if a couple had a female child first, the baby girls were still discarded, because the parents didn't want the financial burden of having two children. They would continuously do this until they had a boy.

== Current situation ==
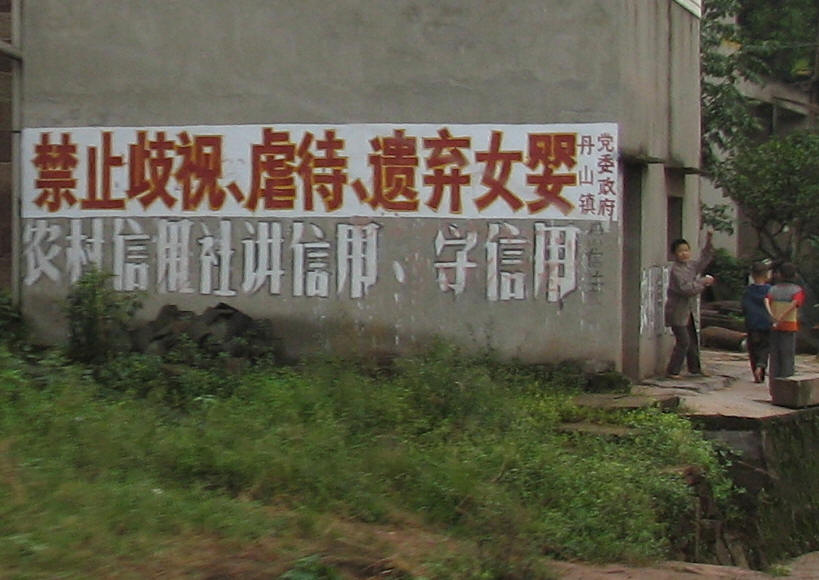
Roadside sign in Danshan, Yanjiang District, Ziyang, Sichuan, which reads "It is forbidden to discriminate against, abuse or abandon baby girls"

Many Chinese couples desire to have sons because they provide support and security to their aging parents later in life. Conversely, a daughter is expected to leave her parents upon marriage to join and care for her husband's family (parents-in-law). In rural households, which as of 2014 constitute almost half the Chinese population, males are additionally valuable for performing agricultural work and manual labor.

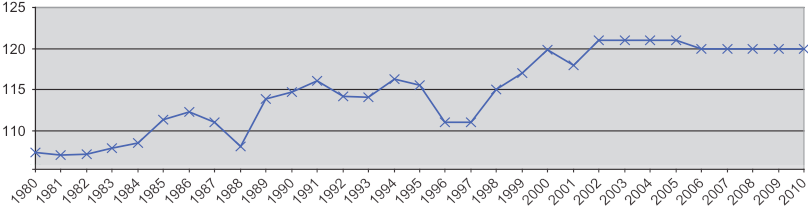
Birth sex ratios have dramatically changed in China since the implementation of the One-Child Policy.

A 2005 inter-census survey demonstrated pronounced differences in sex ratio across provinces, ranging from 1.04 in Tibet to 1.43 in Jiangxi. Banister (2004), in her literature review on China's shortage of girls, suggested that there has been a resurgence in the prevalence of female infanticide following the introduction of the one-child policy. On the other hand, many researchers have argued that female infanticide is rare in China today, especially since the government has outlawed the practice. Zeng and colleagues (1993), for example, contended that at least half of the nation's gender imbalance arises from the underreporting of female births.

According to the Geneva Centre for the Democratic Control of Armed Forces (DCAF), the demographic shortfall of female babies who have died for gender-related issues is in the same range as the 191 million estimated dead accounting for all conflicts in the twentieth century. In 2012, the documentary It's a Girl: The Three Deadliest Words in the World was released. It focused on female infanticide in India and China.

According to China's 2020 census (the Seventh National Population Census of the People's Republic of China), the gender ratio of mainland China has improved, with the male-to-female ratio reaching a new record low of 105.07. This is the most balanced gender ratio since the PRC began conducting a census in 1953.

=== Female infanticides' effects on population and society ===
Female infanticide, especially as a result of the One-Child Policy, has caused an imbalance of genders and available females of childbearing age resulting in a decline in population and births. In 2017 there were under 13 births per 1000 people. There were also 33 million more men than women. The ratio imbalance between childbearing females and males because of female infanticide has also led to the rise of sex trafficking and bridal kidnapping of females or importing brides from other countries.

=== Preventing female infanticide ===
The Chinese government has enacted three laws to try to prevent future occurrences of female infanticide. The Mother and Child Health Care Law of 1994 prevented sex identification of the fetus and prohibited the use of technology for the use of selective abortions based on the fetus's sex in order to protect female infants. The Marriage Law and the Women's Protection Law both prohibit female infanticide and protect women's rights. There is also a campaign started called "Care for Girls" which gives financial support to female-only families and supports equality between the genders.

=== Underreporting of female babies ===
In December 2016, researchers at the University of Kansas reported that the sex disparity in China was likely exaggerated due to administrative under-reporting and that delayed registration of females, instead of the abortion and infanticide practices. The finding challenged the earlier assumptions that rural Chinese villagers killed their daughters on a massive scale and concluded that as many as 10 to 15 million missing women hadn't received proper birth registration since 1982. The underreporting is attributed to politics, with families trying to avoid penalties when girls were born, and local government concealing the lack of enforcement from the central government. This implied that the sex disparity of the Chinese newborns was likely exaggerated significantly in previous analyses. Though the degree of data discrepancy, the challenge in relation to sex-ratio imbalance in China is still disputed among scholars.

== See also ==
- Female infanticide in India
- Femicide
- Gendercide
- It's a Girl: The Three Deadliest Words in the World
- List of administrative divisions in China by infant mortality
- List of Chinese administrative divisions by gender ratio
- Misogyny
- Missing women of China
- Sexism
- Sex-selective abortion § China
- Violence against women
- Women and religion
- Women in China
- Women in India

== Bibliography ==
- Abeel, David (13 May 1844). "Infanticide In China". Signal of Liberty. Archived from the original on 8 January 2014.
- Coale, Ansley J.; Banister, Judith (1994). "Five decades of missing females in China". Demography. 31 (3): 459–479. doi:10.2307/2061752. JSTOR 2061752. PMID 7828766. S2CID 24724998. Archived from the original on 2020-01-01.
- DeLugan, Robin Maria (2013). "Exposing Gendercide in India and China (Davis, Brown, and Denier's It's a Girl—the Three Deadliest Words in the World)". Current Anthropology. 54 (5): 649–650. doi:10.1086/672365. JSTOR 10.1086/672365. S2CID 142658205.
- Harrison, Henrietta (2008). "A penny for the little Chinese: The French Holy Childhood Association in China, 1843–1951" (PDF). American Historical Review. 113 (1): 72–92. doi:10.1086/ahr.113.1.72. S2CID 163110059. Archived (PDF) from the original on 2018-11-04.
- Johnson, Kay Ann (1985). Women, the Family, and Peasant Revolution in China. University of Chicago Press. ISBN 978-0226401898.
- Lee, Bernice J. (1981). "Female Infanticide in China". Historical Reflections / Réflexions Historiques. 8 (3): 163–177. JSTOR 41298766.
- Milner, Larry S (2000). Hardness of Heart/hardness of Life: The Stain of Human Infanticide. University Press of America. ISBN 978-0761815785.
- Mungello, D. E. (2012). The Great Encounter of China and the West, 1500–1800. Rowman & Littlefield. ISBN 9781442219755.
- Mungello, D. E. (2008). Drowning Girls in China: Female Infanticide in China since 1650. Rowman & Littlefield. ISBN 978-0742555310.
- Nie, Jing-Bao (2005). Behind the Silence: Chinese Voices on Abortion. Rowman & Littlefield. ISBN 978-0742523715.
- White, Tyrene (2006). China's Longest Campaign: Birth Planning in the People's Republic, 1949–2005. Cornell University Press. ISBN 978-0801444050.
- Winkler, Theodor H. (2005). "Slaughtering Eve The Hidden Gendercide" (PDF). Women in an Insecure World. Geneva Centre for the Democratic Control of Armed Forces. Archived from the original (PDF) on 2019-10-07.
