= Religion and abortion =

Numerous religious traditions have taken a stance on abortion but few are absolute. These stances span a broad spectrum, based on numerous teachings, deities, or religious print, and some of those views are highlighted below.

People of all faiths and religions use reproductive health care services. Abortion is perceived as murder by many religious conservatives. Anti-abortion advocates believe that legalised abortion is a threat to social, moral, and religious values. Religious people who advocate abortion rights generally believe that life starts later in the pregnancy, for instance at quickening, after the first trimester.

The religious influence over the population of the country tends to be one of the massive determining factors on the legality of abortion.

== Baháʼí Faith ==
Abortion, merely for the purpose of eliminating an unwanted child, is strongly deprecated in the Baháʼí Faith, although medical reasons may warrant it. Among the possible reasons for terminating a pregnancy are rape, incest, lack of viability of the fetus, and health of the mother. Though Shoghi Effendi, the Guardian of the Bahá'í Faith, considered the intentional termination of a pregnancy as the ending of a life, there are no specific teachings in the Bahá'í sacred texts addressing it; the Universal House of Justice has thus concluded that it is not quite the same as murder and therefore within the purview of the Universal House of Justice to legislate on it, at a future date, if it so decides. At present, Baháʼís are encouraged to decide based on their own conscience in light of general guidance found in Baháʼí writings and medical advice.

== Buddhism ==
There is no single Buddhist view concerning abortion. Some traditional sources, including some Buddhist monastic codes, hold that life begins at conception, and that abortion, which would then involve the deliberate destruction of life, should be rejected. Complicating the issue is the Buddhist belief that "life is a continuum with no discernible starting point". Among Buddhists, there is no official or preferred viewpoint regarding abortion.

The Dalai Lama has said that abortion is "negative", but there are exceptions. He said, "I think abortion should be approved or disapproved according to each circumstance."

Inducing or otherwise causing an abortion is regarded as a serious matter in the monastic rules followed by both Theravada and Vajrayana monks; monks and nuns must be expelled for assisting a woman in procuring an abortion. Traditional sources do not recognize a distinction between early- and late-term abortion, but in Sri Lanka and Thailand the "moral stigma" associated with an abortion grows with the development of the foetus. While traditional sources do not seem to be aware of the possibility of abortion as relevant to the health of the mother, modern Buddhist teachers from many traditions – and abortion laws in many Buddhist countries – recognize a threat to the life or physical health of the mother as an acceptable justification for abortion as a practical matter, though it may still be seen as a deed with negative moral or karmic consequences.

== Christianity ==
There is scholarly disagreement on how early Christians felt about abortion and whether explicit prohibitions of abortion exist in either the Old Testament or New Testament books of the Christian Bible. Abortion is not specifically mentioned anywhere in the Bible, nor is there any specific commandment against it. Some scholars have concluded that early Christians took a nuanced stance on what is now called abortion and that at different times, and in separate places, early Christians have taken different stances. Other scholars have concluded that early Christians considered abortion a sin at all stages; although there is disagreement over their thoughts on what type of sin it was, and how grave a sin it was held to be, it was seen as at least as grave as sexual immorality. Some early Christians believed that the embryo did not have a soul from conception, and consequently, opinion was divided as to whether or not early abortion was murder or ethically equivalent to murder.

Early church councils punished women for abortions that were combined with other sexual crimes, as well as makers of abortifacient drugs, but, like some early Church Fathers such as Basil of Caesarea, did not make a distinction between "formed" and "unformed" foetuses. While Gregory of Nyssa and Maximus the Confessor held that human life already began at conception, Augustine of Hippo affirmed Aristotle's concepts of ensoulment occurring some time after conception, after which point abortion was to be considered a homicide, while still maintaining the condemnation of abortion at any time from conception onward. Aquinas reiterated Aristotle's views of successive souls: vegetative, animal, and rational. This would be the Catholic Church's position until 1869, when the limitation of automatic excommunication to abortion of a formed foetus was removed, a change that has been interpreted as an implicit declaration that conception was the moment of ensoulment. Most early penitentials imposed equal penances for abortion whether early-term or late-term, but later penitentials in the Middle Ages normally distinguished between the two, imposing heavier penances for late-term abortions and a less severe penance was imposed for the sin of abortion "before [the foetus] has life".

Contemporary Christian denominations have nuanced positions, thoughts, and teachings about abortion, especially in extenuating circumstances. The Catholic Church, the Eastern Orthodox Church, Oriental Orthodoxy, and most Evangelical Protestants oppose deliberate abortion as immoral while allowing what is sometimes called indirect abortion, namely, an action that does not seek the death of the foetus as an end or a means, but that is followed by the death as a side effect. Evangelical Protestants have some of the most opposed views on the topic of abortion, especially compared to those of traditional religions. More specifically, the religious philosophy of both the Catholic Church and many Evangelical Christians denominations is that life begins at conception, and both groups have strong moral prohibitions against abortion, equating it to murder. These two denominations are the primary participators in interest advocacy groups and are strongly associated with anti-abortion activities. This group behavior can include lobbying, activism, protesting, as well as education and campaign contributions. However, states with a higher percentage of Catholics or a higher percentage of the population classified as fundamentalist or conservative Protestant are not more likely to have abortion restrictions in their state legislature. States or countries with a higher Catholic or Evangelical Christian presence than other denominations have more resources and votes in favor of restrictive abortion laws as well as influence over legislators' perception on the issue of abortion.

Some mainline Protestant denominations such as the Methodist Church, Episcopal Church (United States), United Church of Christ, Presbyterian Church (USA), and the Evangelical Lutheran Church of America, among others, are more permissive of abortion. More generally, some Christian denominations can be considered anti-abortion, while others may favor abortion rights. Additionally, there are sizable minorities in some denominations that disagree with their denomination's stance on abortion. A national sample of American abortion patients found that the majority identified as Protestant.

The more religiously devout and those with more religious engagement tend to hold stronger opinions overall, especially on the abortion debate in regard to religions take on abortion's morality. An individual's religious conservatism has a higher likelihood to oppose abortion. However, members of a denomination can have deviating opinions from vocal religious leaders' beliefs.

== Hinduism ==
Most classical Hindu texts strongly condemn abortion, although the Sushruta Samhita recommends it if the fetus is defective. The British Broadcasting Corporation writes, "When considering abortion, the Hindu way is to choose the action that will do least harm to all involved: the mother and father, the foetus and society." The BBC goes on to state, "In practice, however, abortion is practiced in India, because the religious ban on abortion is sometimes overruled by the cultural preference for sons. This can lead to abortion to prevent the birth of girl babies, which is called 'female foeticide'." Hindu scholars and women's rights advocates have supported bans on sex-selective abortions. Some Hindus support abortion in cases where the mother's life is at imminent risk or when the foetus has a life-threatening developmental anomaly.

Some Hindu theologians and Brahma Kumaris believe personhood begins at three months and develops through to five months of gestation, possibly implying permitting abortion up to the third month and considering any abortion past the third month to be destruction of the soul's current incarnate body.

== Islam ==
The Quran and Hadith describe God's creation of man in the womb and condemn infanticide. A verse in the Quran refers to pregnant women who abort their pregnancies upon the day of judgment. Each of the four Sunni Islam schools of thought—Hanafi, Shafi'i, Hanbali and Maliki—have their own reservations on if and when abortions are permissible in Islam. The Maliki madhhab holds "that the fetus is ensouled at the moment of conception" and thus "most Malikis do not permit abortion at any point, seeing God's hand as actively forming the fetus at every stage of development." On the other hand, some Hanafi scholars believe that abortion before the hundred twenty day period is over is permitted, though some Hanafi scholars teach that an abortion within 120 days is makruh (disapproved, i.e. discouraged). The other Islamic schools of thought agree abortion is recommended when the mother's life is in danger, because the mother's life is paramount.

Muslim scholars differ as to when fetus is given a soul: some say 40 days after conception, while others say 120 days. Nevertheless, Muslim scholars also assert an embryo's right to be respected starting at conception, even if it is not yet regarded as human life. Before 120 days some scholars permit abortion in cases of "great" fetal deformity. Mauritania prohibits abortion under any circumstance. In Shia Islam, abortion is "forbidden after implantation of the fertilised ovum." The leader of the Iranian Islamic Revolution, Ayatollah Khomeini declared that shari'a forbids abortion without any reason "even at the earliest possible stage". Iranian Ayatollah Ali Khamenei permitted abortion at 10 weeks in cases of thalassemia. Abortion before 120 days was allowed in cases of rape during the Bosnian war.

After 120 days the fetus is believed to be human life, yet it is still permissible to abort it to save the life of the mother. This is because a fetus will die anyway if the mother dies, and the mother is part of a family and she has responsibilities.

== Judaism ==
Orthodox Jewish teaching allows abortion if necessary to safeguard the life of the pregnant woman. While the Reform, Reconstructionist, and Conservative movements openly advocate for the right to a safe and accessible abortion, the Orthodox movement is less unified on the issue. Many Orthodox Jews oppose abortion, except when it is necessary to save a woman's life (or, according to some, the woman's health).

In Judaism, views on abortion draw primarily upon the legal and ethical teachings of the Hebrew Bible, the Talmud, the case-by-case decisions of responsa, and other rabbinic literature. Generally speaking, Orthodox Jews oppose abortion after the 40th day, with health-related exceptions, and reform Jews tend to allow greater latitude for abortion. There are rulings that often appear conflicting on the matter. The Talmud states that a foetus is not legally a person until it is delivered. The Torah contains the law that, "When men fight, and one of them pushes a pregnant woman, and a miscarriage results, but no other misfortune, the one responsible shall be fined...but if other misfortune ensues, the penalty shall be life (nefesh) for life (nefesh)." (Exodus 21:22–25). That is, causing a woman to miscarry is a crime, but not a capital crime, because the fetus is not considered a person.

Jeremiah 1:5 states that, "Before I formed you in the womb, I knew you, before you were born, I set you apart; I appointed you as a prophet to the nations." For some, this verse, while talking specifically about Jeremiah, is an indication that God is aware of the identity of "developing unborn human beings even before they enter the womb", or that for everyone, God has a plan that abortion might be seen as frustrating. Others say that this interpretation is incorrect, and that the verse is not related to personhood or abortion, as Jeremiah is asserting his prophetic status as distinct and special.

The Hebrew Bible has a few references to abortion; Exodus 21:22-25 addresses miscarriage by way of another's actions, which it describes as a non-capital offense punishable through a fine. The Book of Numbers in the Hebrew Bible describes the Ordeal of the bitter water (sotah) to be administered by a priest to a wife whose husband thinks she was unfaithful. Some scholars interpret the text as involving an abortifacient potion or otherwise that induces a miscarriage if the woman is pregnant with another man's child. Rabbinical scholar Arnold Ehrlich interprets the ordeal such that it ends either harmlessly if the woman is faithful, or with an induced abortion: "the embryo falls".

== Sikhism ==
The Sikh Sikh Rehat Maryada (code of conduct) does not deal directly with abortion. However, it does explicitly prohibit the practice of 'kuri-mar', a Punjabi term which literally means "girl killing" but also encompasses female foeticide.

The Guru Granth Sahib (primary scripture and source of Sikh religious guidance for Sikhs), does not provide any specific dictate on abortion. Many Sikhs will therefore interpret certain parts of texts and make a personal decision when confronted with a clearly abnormal fetus.

However, while there is no explicit prohibition in the Guru Granth Sahib or the Sikh Rehat Maryada, abortion is generally viewed by some Sikhs as forbidden because it is said to interfere with the creative work of God. Despite this theoretical viewpoint, abortion is not uncommon among the Sikh community in India, and there is growing concern that female foetuses are being aborted because of the cultural preference for sons.

== Unitarian Universalism ==
The Unitarian Universalist Church strongly supports abortion rights. In 1978, the Unitarian Universalist Association passed a resolution that declared, "...[the] right to choice on contraception and abortion are important aspects of the right of privacy, respect for human life, and freedom of conscience of women and their families". The Association had released earlier statements in 1963 and 1968 favoring the reform of restrictive abortion laws.

== See also ==
- Abortion debate
- Abortion law
- Religious Coalition for Reproductive Choice
- Religious views on birth control
- Separation of church and state
