= Baby tower =

Structure in ancient China used for discarding unwanted children

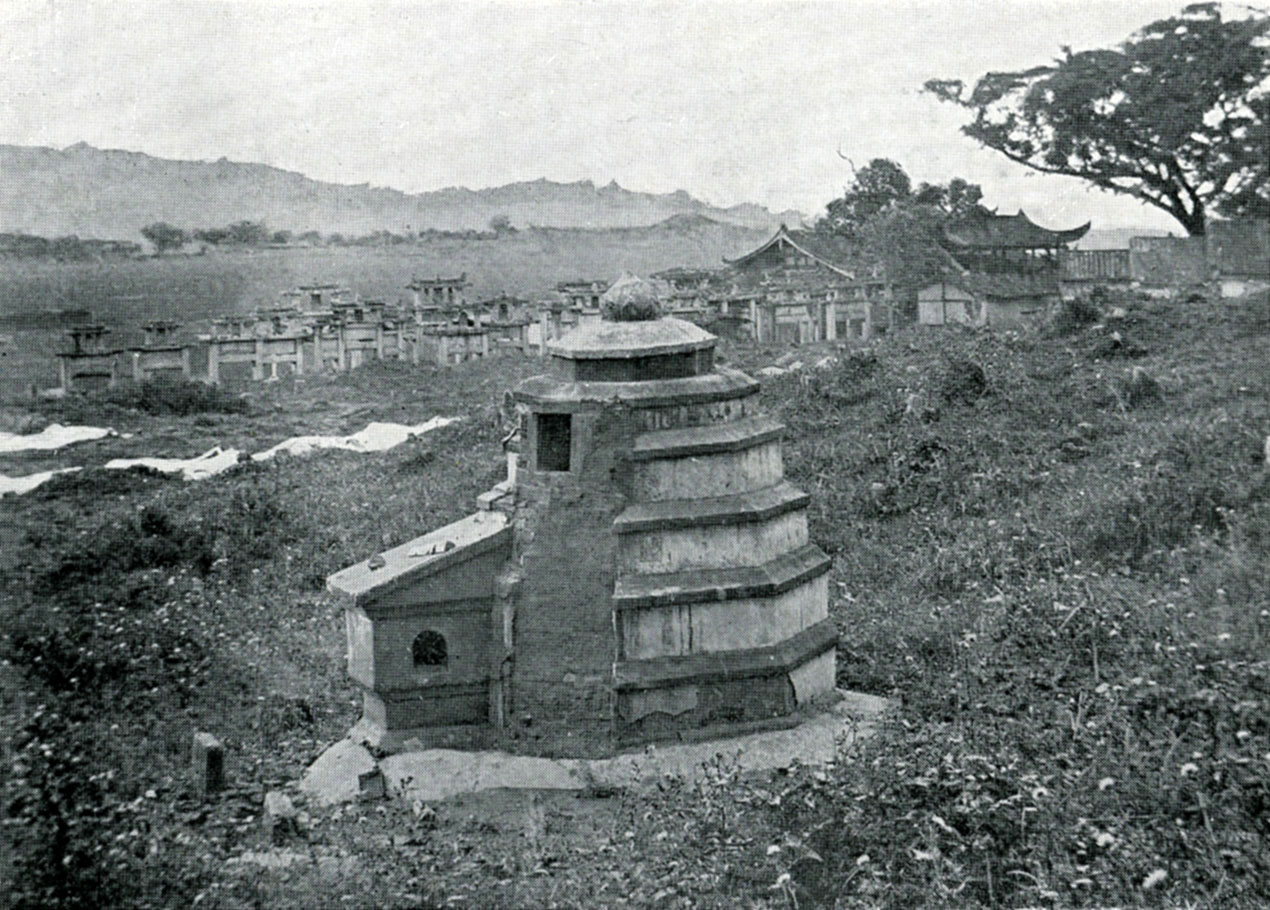
Baby tower in Fuzhou, Fujian Province

A baby tower, also known as an abandoned infant tower or baby girl tower, is an architectural structure found in various places in ancient China. They would typically take the form of a small stone or brick tower with an opening on the top. Dead, disabled, female, and unwanted infants could be placed inside, possibly to be abandoned. The baby tower is described as a donation from wealthy people in the countryside, as a more humane alternative to drowning babies in a river, common at the time. The pagoda architectural style is intended to suppress the spirit of the children, to prevent them from being reincarnated.

Gender selection of children in China has been an issue for a long time due to the undesirability of female children in the Chinese patriarchal society, and the perception of male children as being more valuable for work, especially among peasants.

== Baby towers and W. Somerset Maugham ==
In his 1922 travelogue On a Chinese Screen, W. Somerset Maugham describes encountering a baby tower during his travels in China in Chapter 42:

...A trodden path led to a little tower and I followed it. It was a stumpy little tower, ten feet high perhaps, made of rough-hewn blocks of stone; it was cone-shaped and the roof was like a Pierrot’s hat. It stood on a hillock, quaint and rather picturesque against the blue sky, amid the graves. At its foot were a number of rough baskets thrown about in disorder. I walked round and on one side saw an oblong hole, eighteen inches by eight, perhaps, from which hung a stout string. From the hole there came a very strange, a nauseating odour. Suddenly I understood what the queer little building was. It was a baby tower.

In The Painted Veil (2007 edition; originally published in 1925), W. Somerset Maugham references the practice of infant abandonment in China through a fictional account involving a convent. In Chapter 51, he writes, “The moment they [the nuns] arrived they began to save the poor little unwanted girls from the baby-tower and the cruel hands of the midwife.” This portrayal reflects early 20th-century Western perceptions of baby towers and female infanticide in China, often framed through a humanitarian or missionary lens.

== Baby towers and missionaries ==
In "Mission Dilemmas: Bride Price, Minor Marriage, Concubinage, Infanticide, and Education of Women" (2002), Jessie G. Lutz provides contextual background for understanding the Western missionary perspective on social practices in China, including infanticide. Although the article does not explore baby towers in depth, it offers insight into why missionaries documented such practices extensively. It also includes detailed information on the role of Catholic orphanages in China, shedding light on missionary responses to child abandonment and care.

In A Yankee on the Yangtze (1904), William Edgar Geil—a prominent American missionary and adventurer—mentions baby towers on multiple occasions. His travel narrative reflects both his evangelical perspective and the broader Western imagination of China during the late 19th and early 20th centuries. Geil's depictions of baby towers, which appear at least five times throughout the text, can be usefully compared with other missionary accounts to illustrate how Western observers framed practices like infant abandonment and infanticide. These writings often combined moral concern with orientalist interpretations, contributing to the enduring image of China as a land in need of Christian reform and Western intervention.

In her article "Rethinking Western Representation of the Orient: China in Ana d'Almeida's Diary" (2015), Eliza S.K. Leong provides a critical analysis of 19th-century Western depictions of baby towers from the perspective of a female traveler. She argues that such representations reinforced Orientalist narratives portraying China as “barbaric” and in need of moral and cultural reform. Leong also highlights how these accounts invoked ideals of white women's motherhood and philanthropic responsibility, linking the discourse on baby towers to broader themes of gender and domesticity in Western missionary and travel literature.

== Baby towers and the question of infanticide ==
In Between Birth and Death: Female Infanticide in Nineteenth-Century China (2014), historian Michelle Tien King examines a wide range of written records by local writers, foreign correspondents, and missionaries concerning the practice of female infanticide and the use of so-called "baby towers." King finds no evidence in these sources to support claims that infants were abandoned alive in such structures. Citing John Scarth, she suggests that baby towers were intended for burial purposes. King also argues that Western perceptions of baby towers were shaped by orientalist narratives, which were later perpetuated in tourist guidebooks during the late 19th and early 20th centuries. In Drowning Girls in China: Female Infanticide since 1650 (2008), D. E. Mungello discusses the practice of infant exposure in relation to Buddhist baby towers. He notes that while infanticide in private settings was more common, instances of infant abandonment in public spaces, including baby towers, did occur. However, Mungello remains uncertain whether infants placed in these towers were intended for adoption or burial, and the gender distribution of these infants is also unclear.

In his 2019 project, “Cradle to Grave: Baby Towers and the Politics of Infant Burial in Qing China,” Jeffrey Snyder-Reinke challenges the notion of baby towers as evidence of "barbaric" practices. Drawing on historical research, he argues that baby towers were likely a relatively recent and regionally specific response to the issue of infant burial, particularly in the Shanghai area. He supports this claim with two key points: first, that classical Chinese texts offer little guidance on the proper burial of infants; and second, that beginning in the 18th century, Qing officials in several provinces actively opposed the public exposure of infant bodies.

In The Evolution of Women’s Legal Status in Republican China and the Modern Chinese Literature Writing (2021), Zhang Min examines the historical and legal efforts to combat female infanticide from the late Qing period through the Republican era. Zhang provides detailed accounts of legal prohibitions against infanticide—particularly female infanticide—enacted between the late 19th century and 1929. These legal measures reflect attempts by local and national governments to curb the practice, which persisted in certain regions even after the fall of the Qing dynasty in 1912. Although baby towers are not a central focus of the book, Zhang references a Western missionary's 1872 account describing baby tower use as evidence of the prevalence of female infanticide at the time. The legal context presented in the book offers readers a broader understanding of how Chinese authorities sought to address infanticide through formal regulation, highlighting the tension between cultural practices and legal reforms.

== See also ==
- Sex-ratio imbalance in China
- Sex-selective abortion
- Female infanticide in China
