= Son preference =

Cultural preference for male offspring

Son preference is the ancient and cross-cultural human preference for male (rather than female) offspring. Son preference has been demonstrated across all social classes, from "succession laws in royal families to land inheritance in peasant families." Sons are considered both a status symbol and a genetic and economic competitive advantage.

Son preference can influence birth rates and thus population growth. Parents will continue having children until they have produced the desired number of sons; there is no equivalent behavior in respect to daughters. Families with sons have been shown to have increased levels of "marital stability and marital satisfaction," and the presence of sons may increase paternal involvement in child-rearing. In the 21st century, son preference has been broadly documented in South and East Asia, but is also observable in Western countries.

An example of son preference is demonstrated by the traditions of the Igbo people of Nigeria: "The status of a man is assessed in part by his number of sons. A man with many sons is viewed as a wealthy or an accomplished man." Igbo men that die without fathering sons are seen as having been "unaccomplished or a misfit" and are not given ceremonial second burials.

Son preference is culturally mediated and expression of it may change with circumstances. For example, demonstrations of son preference declined in "subsequent generations" of Turkish immigrants to Germany. Additionally, researchers have found that increasing levels of "gender indifference" and decreasing levels of son preference, for example as documented in Taiwan since 1990, can be correlated to maternal educational levels. Son preference in Asian-immigrant households in the United States is higher amongst couples from the same country and higher in mixed-origin marriages where the male partner is the immigrant.

Son preference may result in sex selection practices. Birth of daughters can result in gender disappointment in societies that have strong son preference. Daughter preference or son preference is sometimes expressed by higher levels of household investment in offspring of preferred gender.

== See also ==
- Female infanticide
- Son preference in China
- Patrilineality
- Patronymic
- Male heir
- Human Y-chromosome DNA haplogroup
- Human reproductive ecology
