= List of Chinese provincial-level divisions by infant mortality =

Sex-based statistics regarding the rate of infant mortality by administrative divisions in the People's Republic of China have been collected. Disparity in rates of female infant mortality by Chinese administrative divisions has been noted in public health statistics since the first modern Chinese census in 1982 which showed significantly higher rates of female infant mortality. Already abnormal female infant mortality deteriorated further in censuses held in 1989 and 2000.

== Census data ==
=== 2010 ===
The infant mortality rates by administrative division from the 6th National Population Census held in 2010 are adjusted upwards according to a methodology by the authors Professors Hong Rongqing and Zeng Xianxin of Capital University of Economics and Business in "Infant Mortality Reported in the 2010 Census: Bias and Adjustment", published in Population Research in March 2013. The authors estimate that the infant mortality rate from the 6th Census is severely underreported by about 78%. Undereporting of the infant mortality rate in the 6th Census is also the conclusion in a note analyzing the 6th Census by the China offices of UNICEF and UNFPA.

Color	Regions of China
	North China
	East China
	Southwestern China
	Northwestern China
	South Central China
	Northeast China

Rank	Name	Region	Male	Female	Male/Female
1	Hainan	South Central China	20.32	27.00	0.75
2	Jiangxi	East China	20.32	25.97	0.78
3	Gansu	Northwestern China	20.32	25.30	0.80
4	Guizhou	Southwestern China	26.98	32.79	0.82
5	Yunnan	Southwestern China	26.98	29.87	0.90
6	Fujian	East China	15.93	17.57	0.91
7	Guangdong	South Central China	15.93	17.46	0.91
8	Shanxi	North China	20.32	21.89	0.93
9	Shandong	East China	15.93	16.57	0.96
10	Guangxi	South Central China	20.32	21.12	0.96
11	Hubei	South Central China	15.93	16.30	0.98
12	Henan	South Central China	20.32	20.69	0.98
13	Anhui	East China	20.32	20.59	0.99
14	Hunan	South Central China	20.32	20.27	1.00
15	Tibet	Southwestern China	31.07	30.90	1.01
16	Shaanxi	Northwestern China	17.77	17.14	1.04
17	Beijing	North China	9.83	9.37	1.05
18	Hebei	North China	15.93	14.76	1.08
19	Sichuan	Southwestern China	20.32	18.82	1.08
20	Zhejiang	East China	15.93	14.56	1.10
21	Ningxia	Northwestern China	20.32	18.32	1.11
22	Qinghai	Northwestern China	33.48	29.94	1.12
23	Jiangsu	East China	11.08	9.90	1.12
24	Chongqing	Southwestern China	17.77	15.67	1.13
25	Jilin	Northeast China	15.93	13.44	1.19
26	Xinjiang	Northwestern China	26.47	22.21	1.19
27	Liaoning	Northeast China	15.93	12.23	1.30
28	Inner Mongolia	North China	15.93	12.10	1.32
29	Heilongjiang	Northeast China	17.77	13.19	1.35
30	Shanghai	East China	9.83	7.11	1.38
31	Tianjin	North China	9.83	6.35	1.55

=== 2000 ===
Infant mortality rates are based on the 5th National Population Census held in 2000 and calculations of male/female differences are from the medical journal article "Gender Difference of Infant Mortality and its Disparity among Provinces in China" published in the Chinese Journal of Health Statistics in April 2013.

Rank	Name	Region	Male	Female	Male/Female
1	Jiangxi	East China	31.36	78.50	0.40
2	Hainan	South Central China	17.37	32.77	0.53
3	Guangxi	South Central China	22.98	41.36	0.56
4	Henan	South Central China	17.65	30.29	0.58
5	Guangdong	South Central China	13.20	22.37	0.59
6	Anhui	East China	26.78	42.07	0.64
7	Shaanxi	Northwestern China	26.62	41.01	0.65
8	Fujian	East China	17.74	26.59	0.67
9	Hebei	North China	15.31	21.51	0.71
10	Gansu	Northwestern China	45.11	62.13	0.73
10	Hunan	South Central China	24.50	33.50	0.73
12	Hubei	South Central China	17.22	22.63	0.76
13	Guizhou	Southwestern China	58.00	74.90	0.77
13	Yunnan	Southwestern China	61.77	79.71	0.77
15	Shandong	East China	13.54	16.88	0.80
16	Jiangsu	East China	13.28	16.02	0.83
17	Shanxi	North China	17.83	21.09	0.85
18	Zhejiang	East China	11.09	12.90	0.86
19	Inner Mongolia	North China	30.25	34.02	0.89
20	Shanghai	East China	4.23	4.59	0.92
21	Qinghai	Northwestern China	49.05	52.21	0.94
22	Liaoning	Northeast China	10.90	11.45	0.95
23	Sichuan	Southwestern China	21.12	22.09	0.96
24	Jilin	Northeast China	17.79	18.20	0.98
25	Beijing	North China	3.79	3.82	0.99
25	Tianjin	North China	4.42	4.45	0.99
27	Ningxia	Northwestern China	27.67	26.95	1.03
27	Tibet	Southwestern China	43.67	42.34	1.03
29	Heilongjiang	Northeast China	11.59	10.28	1.13
30	Xinjiang	Northwestern China	42.41	37.64	1.13
31	Chongqing	Southwestern China	—	—	—

== See also ==
- Female infanticide in China
- Health in China
