= Kay Ann Johnson =

American sinologist

Kay Ann Johnson (1946–2019) was an American scholar of Asian studies whose research focused on the human impact of China's one-child policy. Her work on the experiences of rural families was influenced by her adoption of a daughter from China.

== Early life and education ==
Born in Chicago, Johnson earned her B.A., M.A., and Ph.D. in political science from the University of Wisconsin, Madison. Her 1976 doctoral thesis was on women's rights and family reform in China.

== Career ==
After teaching at the University of California, San Diego, she joined the faculty of Hampshire College in 1979 as a professor of Asian studies and political science.

In 1991, after adopting a daughter from Wuhan, China, Johnson shifted her academic focus to research the consequences of the one-child policy. Through interviews and fieldwork in rural villages, she documented the measures used to enforce the policy, including fines, forced sterilizations, and the seizure of children. Her research indicated that the abandonment of daughters was often a consequence of government pressure rather than a reflection of familial value for female children.

== Adoption advocacy ==
Johnson's adoption of her daughter, LiLi, was among the first from China to the United States. This influenced other American families to adopt from China and contributed to the formation of support groups such as Families With Children From China, for which she served as an adviser.

== Writing ==
Johnson's first book, Women, the Family and Peasant Revolution in China (University of Chicago Press, 1983), argued that Communist programmes left patriarchal household power structures largely intact. Her second major study, Wanting a Daughter, Needing a Son (2004), drew on village interviews to trace how birth-planning quotas fuelled infant abandonment and the growth of orphanages during the 1990s. She extended that inquiry in China's Hidden Children (2016), documenting secret adoptions, trafficked “out-of-plan” children and the emotional toll on rural parents under coercive policy enforcement.
