= Female infanticide in India =

Intentional killing of female infants in India

Female infanticide in India has a history spanning centuries. Poverty, the dowry system, births to unmarried women, deformed infants, famine, lack of support services, and maternal illnesses such as postpartum depression are among the causes that have been proposed to explain the phenomenon of female infanticide in India.

Although infanticide has been criminalized in India, it remains an under-reported crime due to the lack of reliable data. In 2010, the National Crime Records Bureau reported approximately 100 male and female infanticides, producing an official rate of less than one case of infanticide per million people. There were less than 100 infanticides reported annually in 2021-2023.

The Indian practice of female infanticide and of sex-selective abortion have been cited to explain in part a gender imbalance that has been reported as being increasingly distorted since the 1991 Census of India, although there are also other influences that might affect the trend. An improvement of the national Sex Ratio at Birth from 899 females per 1,000 males in 2014 to 913 in 2021 has been reported.

== Definition ==
Section 315 of the Indian Penal Code defines infanticide as the killing of an infant in the 0–1 year age group. The Code uses this definition to differentiate between infanticide and numerous other crimes against children, such as foeticide and murder. (Note: According to statistics published by the National Crime Records Bureau, a department of the Government of India, kidnapping and abduction represented 40.3 percent of recorded crimes against children in 2010, rape was 20.5 percent, murder (other than infanticide) was 5.3 percent, and exposure and abandonment was 2.7 percent. All other crimes against children accounted for 31.5 percent.)

Some scholarly publications on infanticide use the legal definition. Others, such as the collaboration of Renu Dube, Reena Dube, and Rashmi Bhatnagar, who describe themselves as "postcolonial feminists", adopt a broader scope for infanticide, applying it from foeticide through to femicide at an unspecified age. Barbara Miller, an anthropologist, has "for convenience" used the term to refer to all non-accidental deaths of children up to the age of around 15–16, which is culturally considered to be the age when childhood ends in rural India. She notes that the act of infanticide can be "outright", such as a physical beating, or take a "passive" form through actions such as neglect and starvation. Neonaticide, the killing of a child within 24 hours of birth, is sometimes considered a separate study.

== Colonial period ==
=== Observation ===
From the pre-colonial to the colonial era, British officials in India first became aware of the practice of female infanticide in 1789 in the Benares State, the northern state of Uttar Pradesh. It was noted among members of the ruling Rajput clan by Jonathan Duncan, then the Company Resident. Later, in 1817, in the Jamnagar kingdom in modern-day Gujarat, officials noted that the practice was so entrenched that there were entire taluks of the Jadeja Rajputs where no female children of the clan existed. In the mid-19th century, a magistrate who was stationed in the north-west of the country claimed that for several hundred years no daughter had ever been raised in the strongholds of the Rajahs of Mynpoorie and that only after the intervention of a District Collector in 1845 did the Rajput ruler there keep a daughter alive. The British identified other high-caste communities as practitioners in north, western and central areas of the country; these included the Ahirs, Bedis, Gurjars, Jats, Khatris, Lewa Kanbis, Mohyal Brahmins and Patidars.

A review of scholarship by Miller has shown that the majority of female infanticides in India during the colonial period occurred in the north-west and that it was widespread although not all groups carried out this practice. David Arnold, a member of the subaltern studies group who has used a lot of contemporary sources, says that various methods of outright infanticide were used, reputedly including poisoning with opium, strangulation and suffocation. Poisonous substances such as the root of the plumbago rosea and arsenic were used for abortion, with the latter also ironically being used as an aphrodisiac and cure for male impotence. The act of direct infanticide among Rajputs was usually performed by women, often the mother herself or a nurse. Administration of poison was, in any event, a type of killing particularly associated with women; Arnold describes it as "often murder by proxy", with the man at a remove from the event and thus able to claim innocence.

=== Reliability of colonial reports on infanticide ===
There is no data for the sex ratio in India prior to the period of colonial rule. Reliant as the British were on local high-caste communities for the collection of taxes and the maintenance of law and order, the administrators were initially reluctant to peer too deeply into their private affairs, such as the practice of infanticide. Although this did change in the 1830s, the reluctance reappeared following the cathartic events of the Indian Rebellion of 1857, which caused governance by the East India Company to be supplanted by the British Raj. In 1857, John Cave Browne, a chaplain serving in Bengal Presidency, reported a Major Goldney speculating that the practice of female infanticide among the Jats in the Punjab Province originated from "Malthusian motives". In the Gujarat region, the first cited examples of discrepancies in the sex ratio among Lewa Patidars and Kanbis dates from 1847. These historical records have been questioned by modern scholars, as they were observed from a distance, and those making the recordings never intermingled with their subjects to understand the social, economic, and cultural issues facing them that might influence their actions. Browne documented his speculations on female infanticide using "they tell" hearsay. Bernard Cohn states that the British residents in India would always refrain from accusing an individual or family of infanticide as the crime was difficult to prove in court, despite commonly speculating those entire clans or social groups practiced female infanticide. Cohn says, "female infanticide thus became a 'statistical crime'" during the period of colonial rule in India.

Aside from numerous reports and correspondence on infanticide from colonial officials, there was also a documentation from Christian missionaries. Many of these missionaries were also ethnographers who wrote about the ethnography of India during their time there. Many of the missionaries looked down on India and its culture, characterizing it as ignorant and depraved. Several scholars have questioned the historical narrative of female infanticide in India, as they were reported by individuals who looked down on Indian culture, with female infanticide being one of their reasons for holding said prejudiced viewpoints. Many have noted that the rate of female infanticide was no different in India than in parts of Europe during the 18th and 19th centuries. Some Christian missionaries of the late 19th century, writes Daniel Grey, wrongly believed that female infanticide was sanctioned by the scriptures of Hinduism and Islam, and against which Christianity had "centuries after centuries come into victorious conflict".

=== Repression by colonial authorities ===
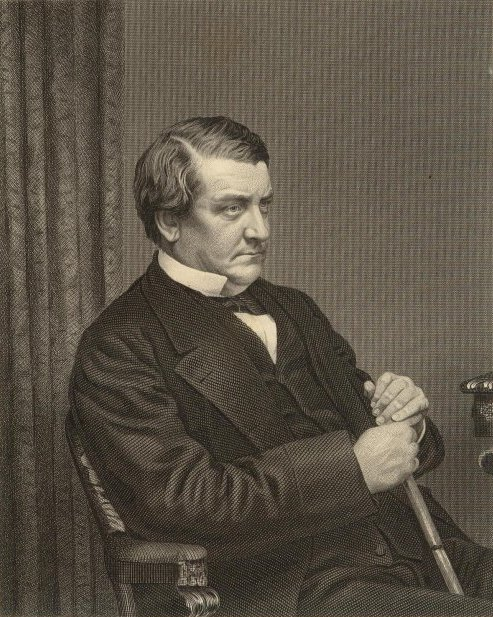
Richard Bourke, 6th Earl of Mayo, was Governor-General of India at the time of the Female Infanticide Prevention Act, 1870.

The passing of the Female Infanticide Prevention Act, 1870 made the practice illegal in the British Indian regions of Punjab and the North-Western Provinces. The Governor-General of India had the authority to expand the Act to other regions at his discretion.

After the passing of the act, colonial administrators became reluctant to report infanticide. Colonial authorities considered that they had identified the problem, and successfully solved it. In reality, infanticide had become a custom.

=== Causation by colonial taxation ===
According to Mara Hvistendahl, documents left behind by the colonial administration following Indian independence showed a direct correlation between the taxation policies of the East India Company and the rise in cases of female infanticide. Compared to the Mughal Empire, the company greatly increased taxes. According to Bernard Cohn, these higher taxes made it difficult for wealthy families to afford dowries, without losing land resources. An investigation by the East India Company in 1855-1856 reported that this was the cause of female infanticide.

=== Other theories on causation ===
According to Marvin Harris, another anthropologist and among the first proponents of cultural materialism, these killings of legitimate children occurred only among the Rajputs and other elite land-owning and warrior groups. The rationale was mainly economic, lying in a desire not to split land and wealth among too many heirs and in avoiding the payment of dowries. Sisters and daughters would marry men of similar standing and thus pose a challenge to the cohesion of wealth and power, whereas concubines and their children would not and thus could be allowed to live. He further argues that the need for warriors in the villages of a pre-industrial society meant female children were devalued, and the combination of war casualties and infanticide acted as a necessary form of population control.

Sociobiologists have a different theory to Harris. Indeed, his theory and interest in the topic of infanticide are born from more generalized opposition to the sociobiological hypothesis of the procreative imperative. According to this theory of imperative, based on the 19th-century vogue for explanations rooted in evolution and its premise of natural selection, the biological differences between men and women meant that many more children could be gained among the elites through support for male offspring, whose fecundity was naturally much greater: the line would spread and grow more extensively. Harris believes this to be a fallacious explanation because the elites had sufficient wealth easily to support both male and female children. Thus, Harris and others, such as William Divale, see female infanticide as a way to restrict population growth, while sociobiologists such as Mildred Dickemann view the same practice as a means of expanding it.

Another anthropologist, Kristen Hawkes, has criticized both of these theories. On the one hand, opposing Harris, she says both that the quickest way to get more male warriors would have been to have more females as child-bearers and that having more females in a village would increase the potential for marriage alliances with other villages. Against the procreative imperative theory, she points out that the corollary to well-off elites such as those in northern India wanting to maximize reproduction is that poor people would want to minimize it and thus in theory should have practiced male infanticide, which it seems they did not.

=== Impact of famines ===
Major famines occurred in India every five to eight years in the 19th- and early 20th-centuries, resulting in millions starving to death. As also happened in China, these events began infanticide: desperate starving parents would either kill a suffering infant, sell a child to buy food for the rest of the family, or beg people to take them away for nothing and feed them. Gupta and Shuzhou state that massive famines and poverty-related historical events had influenced historical sex ratios, and they have had deep cultural ramifications on girls and regional attitudes towards female infant mortality.

=== Regional and religious demographics ===
The decennial census of India from 1881 through 1941 recorded a consistently skewed ratio whereby the number of males exceeded the number of females. The gender difference was particularly high in the north and western regions of India, with an overall sex ratio – males per 100 females – of between 110.2 and 113.7 in the north over the 60-year period, and 105.8 to 109.8 males for every 100 females in western India for all ages. Visaria states that the female deficit among Muslims was markedly higher, next only to Sikhs. South India region was an exception reporting excess females overall, which scholars attribute partly to selective emigration of males.

The overall sex ratios, and excess males, in various regions, were highest among the Muslim population of India from 1881 to 1941, and the sex ratio of each region correlated with the proportion of its Muslim population, with the exception of the eastern region of India where the overall sex ratio was relatively low while it had a high percentage of Muslims in the population. If regions that are now part of modern Pakistan are excluded (Baluchistan, Northwest Frontier, Sind for example), Visaria states that the regional and overall sex ratios for the rest of India over the 1881–1941 period improve in favor of females, with a lesser gap between male and female population.

== Contemporary data and statistics ==
Infanticide in India, and elsewhere in the world, is a difficult issue to objectively assess because reliable data is unavailable. Scrimshaw states that not only the accurate frequency of female infanticide is unknown, differential care between male and female infants is even more elusive data.

Official Criminal statistics in India (NCRB) indicate less than 100 infanticides cases per year in annual reports covering 2021 through 2023. Infanticide can be also recorded under abandonment or concealment of births and these related crimes show higher figures:

- Exposure and abandonment remains the most commonly booked charge with hundreds of cases registered annually from 2012 to 2023.
- Foeticide cases hovered between 100-150 reported instances nationwide in 2023

As reliable data for female infanticide is unavailable, its frequency, and that of sex-selective abortion, is indirectly estimated from the observed high birth sex ratio; that is, the ratio of boys to girls at birth or 0–1 age group infants, or 0–6 age group child sex ratio. The natural ratio is assumed to be 106, or somewhere between 103 and 107, and any number above or below this range is considered as suggestive of female or male foeticide respectively.

Higher sex ratios than in India have been reported for the last 20 years in China, Pakistan, Vietnam, Azerbaijan, Armenia, Georgia and some Southeast European countries, and attributed in part to female infanticide, among other factors. There is an ongoing debate as to the cause of high sex ratios in the 0–1 and 0–6 age groups in India. The suggested reasons for high birth sex ratio include regional female foeticide using amniocentesis regardless of income or poverty because of patrilineal culture, the under-reporting of female births, smaller family size and selective stopping of family size once a male is born.

The Office of the Registrar General of India's SRS (Sample Registration System) showed an improvement in the national sex ratio at birth from a 2014-2016 baseline of 899 females per 1,000 males to 913 females per 1,000 males in the 2021 report.

Sheetal Ranjan reports that the total male and female infanticide reported cases in India were 139 in 1995, 86 in 2005 and 111 in 2010; the National Crime Records Bureau summary for 2010 gives a figure of 100. Scholars state that infanticide is an under-reported crime.

Reports of regional cases of female infanticide have appeared in the media, such as those in Usilampatti in southern Tamil Nadu.

One of the biggest reasons for the increase in female infanticide is being associated with the increase in the number of private Ultrasound Scanning Centres which often tell the sex of a baby, and as they become more accessible and affordable people who could not find out the sex of baby historically, have started finding it out and often results in abortion in case of a girl child.

A report released by United Nations Population Fund (UNFPA) in 2020 said that nearly 45.8 million girls were missing in India due to pre and post-birth selection practices in the country. A study by Washington-based think tank Pew Research said that at least 9 million girls are ‘missing’ in India between 2009 and 2019 as a result of female infanticide.

== Reasons ==
Extreme poverty with an inability to afford raising a child is one of the reasons given for female infanticide in India. Such poverty has been a major reason for high infanticide rates in various cultures, throughout history, including England, France and India.

The dowry system in India is another reason that is given for female infanticide. Although India has taken steps to abolish the dowry system, the practice persists. Still female infanticide and gender-selective abortion is attributed to the fear of being unable to raise a suitable dowry and then being socially ostracised.

Other major reasons given for infanticide, both female and male, include unwanted children, such as those conceived after rape, deformed children born to impoverished families, and those born to unmarried mothers lacking reliable, safe, and affordable birth control. Relationship difficulties, low income, lack of support coupled with mental illness such as postpartum depression have also been reported as reasons for female infanticide in India.

Elaine Rose 1999 reported that disproportionately high female mortality is correlated to poverty, infrastructure, and means to feed one's family and that there has been an increase in the ratio of the probability that a girl survives to the probability that a boy survives with favorable rainfall each year and the consequent ability to irrigate farms in rural India.

Ian Darnton-Hill et al. state that the effect of malnutrition, particularly micronutrient and vitamin deficiency, depends on sex, and it adversely impacts female infant mortality.

== State response ==
In 1991 the Girl Child Protection Scheme was launched. This operates as a long-term financial incentive, with rural families having to meet certain obligations such as sterilisation of the mother. Once the obligations are met, the state puts aside ₹ 2000 in a state-run fund. The fund, which should grow to ₹ 10,000, is released to the daughter when she is 20: she can use it either to marry or to pursue higher education.

In 1992 the Government of India started the "baby cradle scheme". This allows families anonymously to give their child up for adoption without having to go through the formal procedure. The scheme has been praised for possibly saving the lives of thousands of baby girls but also criticised by human rights groups, who say that the scheme encourages child abandonment and also reinforces the low status in which women are held. The scheme, which was piloted in Tamil Nadu, saw cradles placed outside state-operated health facilities. The Chief Minister of Tamil Nadu added another incentive, giving money to families that had more than one daughter. 136 baby girls were given for adoption during the first four years of the scheme. In 2000, 1,218 cases of female infanticide were reported, the scheme was deemed a failure and it was abandoned. It was reinstated in the following year.

The 2011 census data showed a significant decline in the child sex ratio (CSR). Alarmed by the decline, the Government of India introduced Beti Bachao, Beti Padhao (BBBP) initiative. The program is intended to prevent gender discrimination and to ensure survival, protection and education of girls.

== International reactions ==
The Geneva Centre for the Democratic Control of Armed Forces (DCAF) wrote in their 2005 report, Women in an Insecure World, that at a time when the number of casualties in war had fallen, a "secret genocide" was being carried out against women. According to DCAF the demographic shortfall of women who have died for gender related issues is in the same range as the 191 million estimated dead from all conflicts in the 20th century. In 2012, the documentary It's a Girl: The Three Deadliest Words in the World was released. This focused on female infanticide in China and in India.

In 1991 Elisabeth Bumiller wrote May You be the Mother of a Hundred Sons: A Journey Among the Women of India around the subject of infanticide. In the chapter on female infanticide, titled No More Little Girls, she said that the prevailing reason for the practice is "not as the act of monsters in a barbarian society but as the last resort of impoverished, uneducated women driven to do what they thought was best for themselves and their families."

Gift of A Girl Female Infanticide is a 1998 documentary that explores the prevalence of female infanticide in southern India, as well as steps which have been taken to help eradicate the practice. The documentary won an award from the Association for Asian Studies.

== See also ==
- Kuri Mar
- Female foeticide in India
- Female infanticide in China
- Femicide
- Gendercide
- Misogyny
- Sati
- Sexism
- Sex-selective abortion#India
- Violence against women
- Violence against women in India
- Women and religion
