= Kuri-mar =

Kuri-mar (or Kudi-mar) is a Punjabi phrase which literally means "girl killer". Various rehat-namas including the Sikh Rehat Maryada prohibited the practice. Today, the term also encompasses female feticide and may refer to North-western regions of India which have skewed sex ratios.

== Overview ==
Various rehat-namas, philosophical and semi-theological codes of patronage, arbitration and conduct in Dharmic schools of thought, including the Sikh Rehat Maryada prohibited the practice.

In 1699, the tenth and last Sikh Guru, Guru Govind Singh, while baptizing, had prohibited the new followers from marrying, eating or sitting with five clans or sects. The clans or sects were - Mina D'hirmal, the descendants of Pirthi Mal who tried to poison Guru Arjun (the fifth Guru), Musandia, who proclaimed themselves gurus and followed heterodox doctrines, Ram Rayi, the descendants of Ram Ray, who caused the death of Guru Tegh Bahadur (the ninth Guru), Kudi Mar, who destroyed their own daughters, and Bhadani, who shaved their head and beard. The Sikh Rehat Maryada, published in 1950, prohibits the practice strictly.

== See also ==
- Female infanticide in India
- Doodh peeti
