= Gabriel Palatre =

- Born: 1830
- Died: 1878 (aged 47–48)
- Occupations: Jesuit missionary in Shanghai, China
- Known for: against the practice of female infanticide

Gabriel Palâtre (1830–1878) was a Jesuit missionary in Shanghai, China and campaigner against the practice of female infanticide.

== Publications ==
- Relations de la mission de Nan-kin confiée aux religieux de la Compagnie de Jésus
- L'infanticide et l'oeuvre de la Saint-Enfance en Chine
- Le pèlerinage de Notre-Dame-Auxiliatrice, à Zô-Sè, dans le vicariat apostolique de Nan-Kin
- Relations de la mission de Nan-kin confiée aux religieux de la Compagnie de Jésus
- L'infanticide et l'oeuvre de la Sainte-Enfance en Chine

== Bibliography ==
- Handlin-Smith, Joanna (2009). The Art of Doing Good: Charity in Late Ming China. University of California Press. ISBN 978-0520253636.
- Palâtre, Gabriel (1875–1876). Relations de la mission de Nan-kin : confiée aux religieux de la Compagnie de Jésus. Chang-hai : Imprimerie de la Mission Catholique. ISBN 9780524096963. OCLC 37352888.
- Palâtre, Gabriel (1878). L'infanticide et l'oeuvre de la Saint-Enfance en Chine. Chang-hai : Imprimerie de la Mission Catholique. OCLC 71232937.
- Palâtre, Gabriel (1875). Le pèlerinage de Notre-Dame-Auxiliatrice, à Zô-Sè, dans le vicariat apostolique de Nan-Kin. Chang-hai : Imprimerie de la Mission Catholique. OCLC 46831334.
- Palâtre, Gabriel (1875–1876). Relations de la mission de Nan-kin confiée aux religieux de la Compagnie de Jésu. Chang-hai : Imprimerie de la Mission Catholique. OCLC 681633716.
- Palâtre, Gabriel (1878). L'infanticide et l'oeuvre de la Sainte-Enfance en Chine. Chang-hai : Imprimerie de la Mission Catholique. OCLC 23709037.
