= Gendercide =

Systematic killing of members of a specific gender

Gendercide or Gender-related killing is the systematic murder of members of a specific gender. The term is related to the general concepts of assault and murder against victims due to their gender, with violence against men and women being problems which are dealt with by human rights organizations. The term 'gendercide' is similar to the term 'genocide' because gendercide is a form of mass murder; however, the perpetrators of gendercide solely target members of one gender. Politico-military frameworks have historically inflicted militant-governed divisions between femicide and androcide; gender-selective policies increase violence on gendered populations due to their socioeconomic significance. Certain cultural and religious sentiments have also contributed to multiple instances of gendercide across the globe.

== Etymology ==
The term gendercide was first coined by American feminist Mary Anne Warren in her 1985 book, Gendercide: The Implications of Sex Selection. It refers to gender-selective mass killing. Warren drew "an analogy between the concept of genocide" and what she called "gendercide". In her book, Warren wrote:

By analogy, gendercide would be the deliberate extermination of persons of a particular sex (or gender). Other terms, such as "gynocide" and "femicide," have been used to refer to the wrongful killing of girls and women. Nevertheless, "gendercide" is a sex-neutral term in that the victims may be either male or female. There is a need for such a sex-neutral term since sexually discriminatory killing is just as wrong when the victims happen to be male. The term also calls attention to the fact that gender roles have often had lethal consequences and that these are in important respects analogous to the lethal consequences of racial, religious, and class prejudice.

== Femicide ==
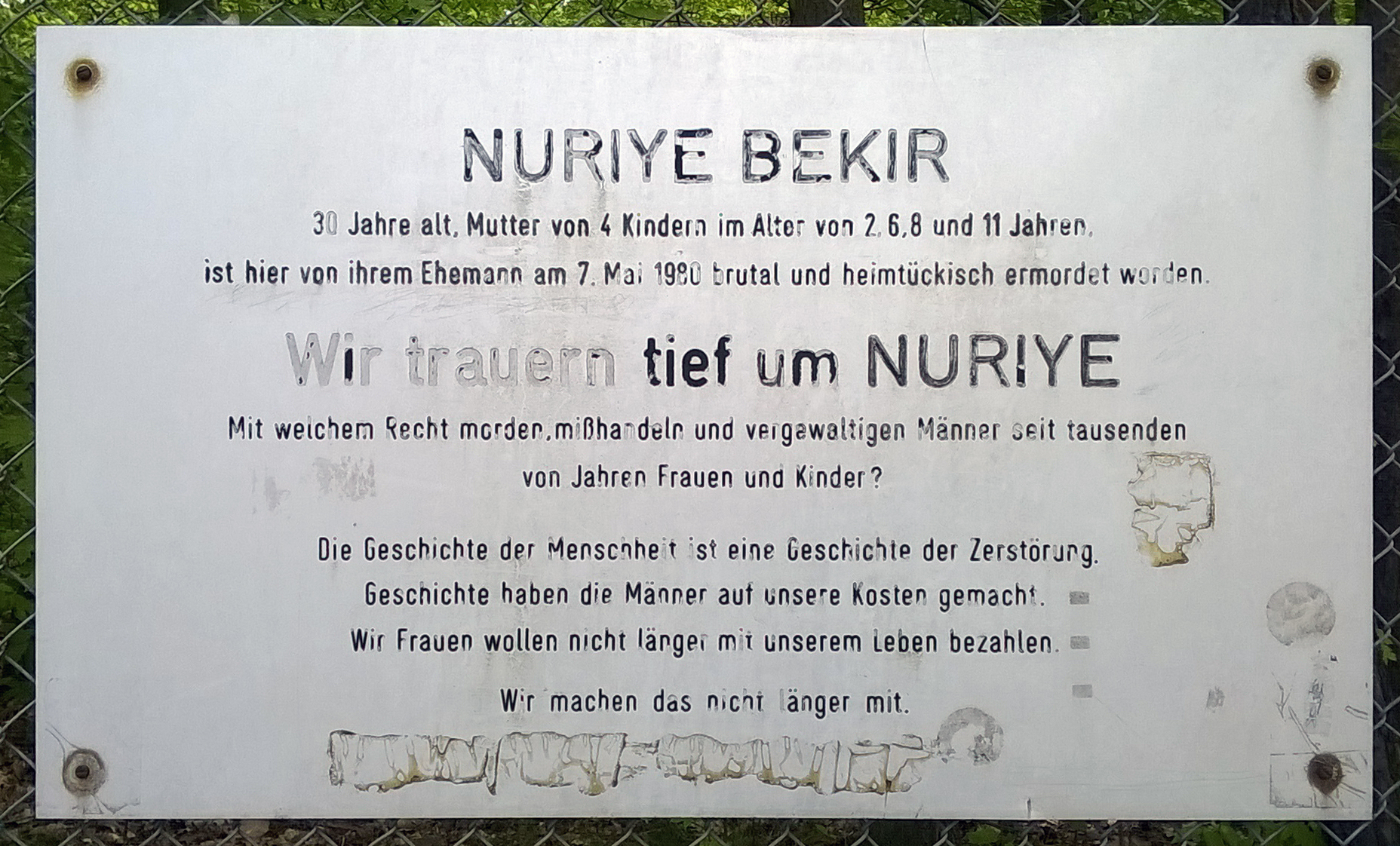
Memorial plaque in Berlin for Nuriye Bekir, who was murdered in an honor killing

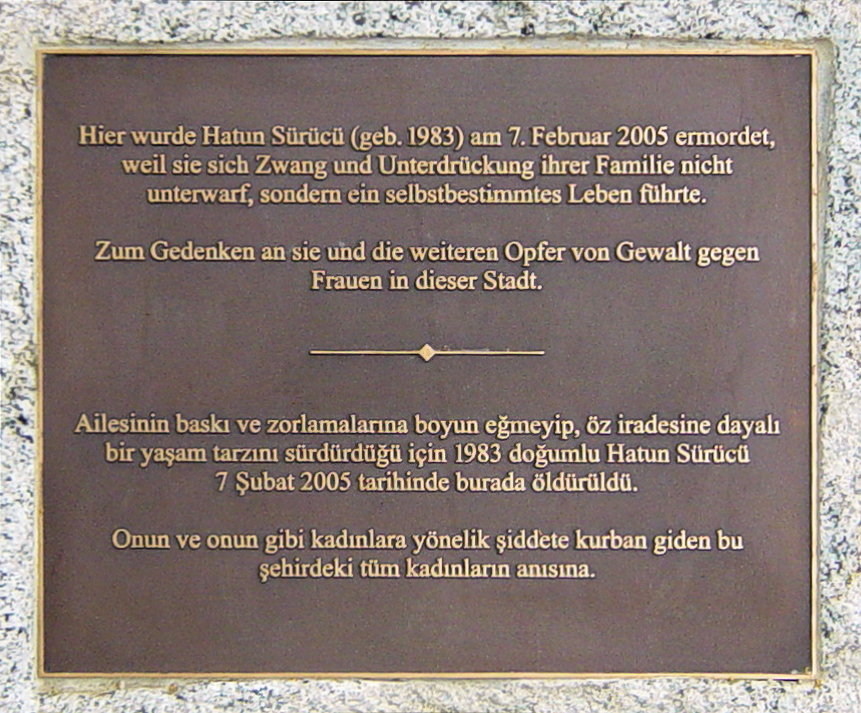
Memorial plaque for Hatun Sürücü in Berlin. The Kurdish woman from Turkey was murdered at the age of 23 by her brothers in an honor killing.

Femicide is defined as the systematic killing of women for various reasons, usually cultural. The word is attested from the 1820s.

The most widespread form of femicide is in the form of gender-selective infanticide in cultures with strong preferences for males such as China and India. According to the United Nations, male-to-female ratios have experienced radical changes from the normal range. Gendercide of girls is reported to be a rising problem in several countries. Census statistics report that in countries such as China, the male to female ratio is as high as 120 men for every 100 women. Many experts attribute such a ratio to institutions such as China's one-child policy. Female heirs were considered less desirable than male heirs, and subsequently abandoned and eliminated in mass. Gendercide also takes the forms of infanticide and lethal violence against a particular gender at any stage of life. The World Bank describes violence against girls and women as a "global pandemic". One in three women experiences gender-based violence in their lifetime. In research released in 2019, 38% of murdered women were killed by an intimate partner.

Sex ratios at birth over time in China:

- 106:100 in 1979 (106 boys for every 100 girls, close to the upper limit of the 'normal' range)
- 111:100 in 1988
- 117:100 in 2001
- 120:100 in 2005

In India, parents may prefer male children because they desire heirs who will care for them in their old age. Other instances of female infanticide are carried out in belief that the female children are better off not being alive, so as to not "[suffer]". Additionally, the cost of a dowry – the family's price for their daughter to be married off – is very high in India, making a female child undesirable, while a male heir would bring a dowry to the family by way of marriage. According to the British publication, The Independent, the 2011 census revealed 7.1 million fewer girls than boys aged under the age of seven, up from 6 million in 2001 and from 4.2 million in 1991. The sex ratio in the age group is now 915 girls to 1,000 boys (109 boys for every 100 girls), the lowest since records began in 1961.

There have been reports of femicide in Ciudad Juárez, Chihuahua, Mexico, where 411 assassinations of women were qualified as serial and/or of sexual characteristic, by domestic violence, intimate femicides and hatred against women. The response to these murders has included the criminalisation of feminicide in the country.

Contemporary mechanisms of gendercide lie within sexualized violence against women; the women and girls of "sub-Saharan Africa (Sierra Leone, the Democratic Republic of Congo, Angola) in areas that are also at the heart of the "AIDS belt", are not only at-risk due to living in places where there are "current cases of large-scale rape", but are also susceptible to contracting HIV. Less popularized tactics of gendercide against women include the systemic withholding of critical medical, and nutritional care, predominantly occurring "across the belt of "deep patriarchy" extending from East through West Asia and into Northern Africa"; here. Adam Jones, a co-founder of Gendercide Watch, an online research platform created to spread awareness, estimates that the denial of healthcare for women equates to approximately the same toll as that of the 1994 Rwandan Genocide per year.

Over 200,000 die from bleeding, with many giving birth in buses or bullock carts. Lack of health education restricts commonplace medical knowledge; thus, bystanders are unable to offer assistance. In addition, the casualty rate from self-administered abortions is roughly 75,000. Eclampsia, a condition possible pre-, during, and post-childbirth, is characterized by seizures due to high blood pressure, and its effects kill another 75,000 through damage to the brain and kidneys. Moreover, 100,000 die from sepsis, contracted through untreated infections of the uterus and remaining fragments of the placenta that poison the bloodstream. Also, female casualties due to labor obstructions stagger around the 400,000 range.

Female genital mutilation also proves itself a form of gendercide, with at least 200 million girls and women having been cut in 31 different countries, most prominently in MENA countries. The practice has shown to have both fatal immediate and long-term complications. Immediate complications include infection, bleeding, urinary problems, and long-term complications include vaginal and menstrual problems, decreased sexual satisfaction, and complications with childbirth, including the increased risk of newborn deaths.

Additionally, women have historically been the victims of sexual violence, and rape has been repeatedly used as both a weapon of war, and a form of genocide. For example, "between the months of January and August of 1945," there were over "1.4 million" reported "rape cases". Subsequently, some "200,000 girls and women" died because of sexually transmitted diseases.

Adam Jones drafted possible solutions to aid the crisis in Africa. He concluded treatment "would mean training some 850,000 health workers, according to UNICEF and World Health Organization reports, as well as [funding] the necessary drugs and equipment. The total cost would be US $200 million, about the price of half a dozen jet fighters".

== Androcide ==
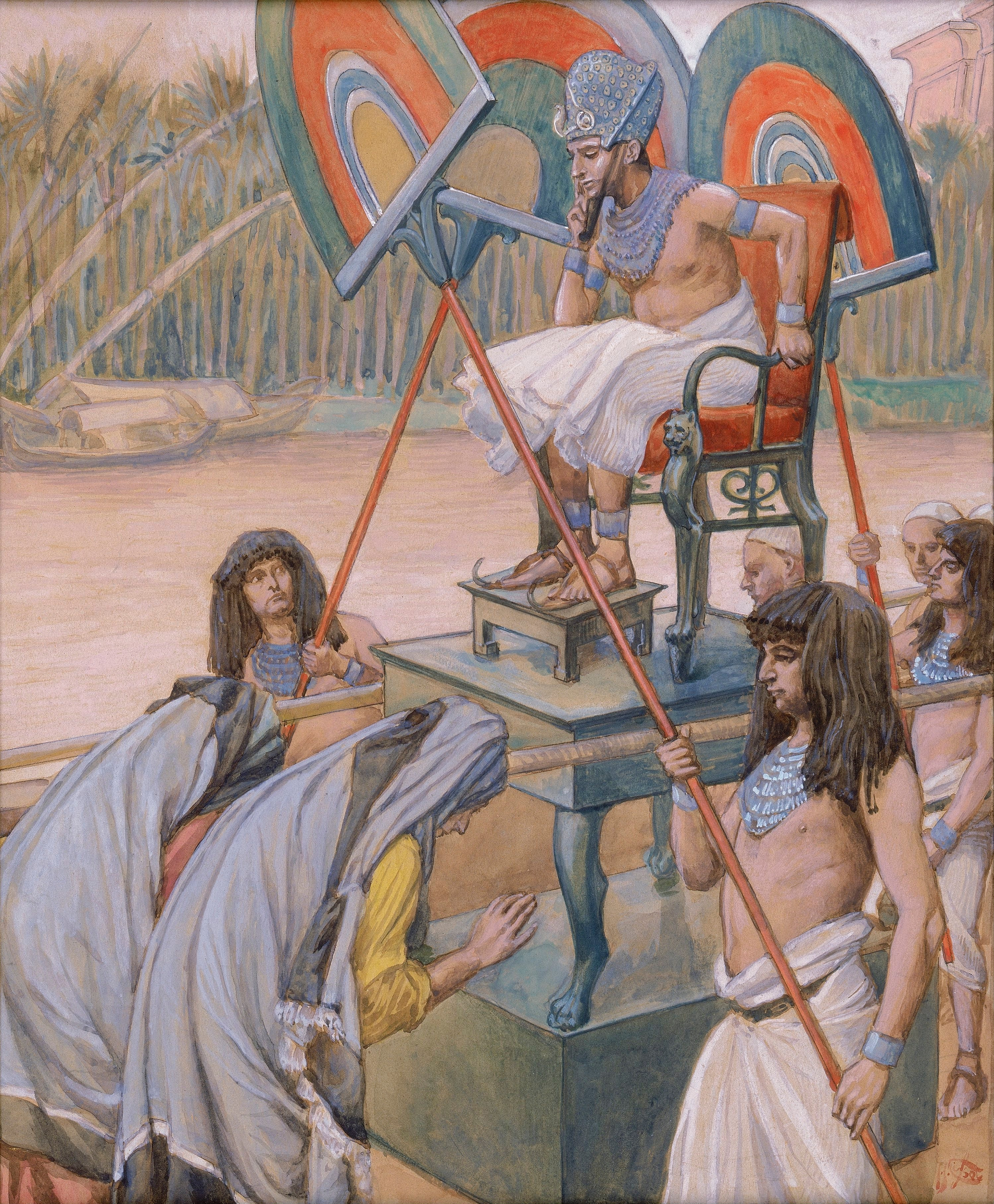
Pharaoh and the Midwives, James Tissot c. 1900. In Exodus 1:15-21, Puah and Shiphrah were commanded by Pharaoh to kill all of the Hebrew newborn baby boys, but they disobeyed.

Androcide is the systematic killing of men or boys for various reasons, usually cultural. Androcide may happen during war to reduce an enemy's potential pool of soldiers. According to the Global Justice Center, perpetrators of genocide often target men and boys first or give them greater priority, and they may also suffer "other acts of violence ... such as torture, rape, and enslavement" that tend to be obscured by a focus on the killings themselves.

Examples include the 1988 Anfal campaign carried out by Ba'athist Iraq against Kurdish males that were considered "battle-aged" (or approximately ages 15–50) in Iraqi Kurdistan. While many of these deaths took place after the Kurdish men were captured and processed at a concentration camp, the worst instances of the gendercide happened at the end of the campaign (August 25 – September 6, 1988).

Another incident of androcide was the Srebrenica massacre of approximately 8,000 Bosniak men and boys on July 11, 1995, ruled as an act of genocide by the International Court of Justice. From the morning of July 11, Serb forces began gathering men and boys from the refugee population in Potočari and holding them in separate locations, and as the refugees began boarding the buses headed north towards Bosniak-held territory, Serb soldiers separated men of military age who were trying to clamber aboard. Occasionally, younger and older men were stopped (some as young as 14 or 15).

Individual men also fall victim to honor killings. Male honor killings are often carried out by family members to prevent dishonor from falling onto families; reasons for male honor killings include sexuality and gender identity.

According to genocide scholar Adam Jones, "non-combatant men have been and continue to be the most frequent targets of mass killing and genocidal slaughter, as well as a host of lesser atrocities and abuses."

== Third gender ==
Gendercide against third gender people is the systemic killing of people who do not fit within the gender binary. The violence perpetrated against Indigenous peoples of the Americas who did not conform to European sexual and gender norms due to this nonconformity has been described as genocide. Thais Torres-Castro and Amalia Morales-Villena highlight this in the colonization of Puerto Rico and the genocide of indigenous people who did not follow the gender binary.

Deborah Miranda uses the term gendercide to identify the Spanish colonial practice of systemically targeting joyas (the Spanish term for third gender people) in an attempt to exterminate them. Qwo-Li Driskill writes how this violence was waged against people now understood as two-spirit.

In 1513 at Santa Clara, Darien (present day Panama), Spanish explorer Vasco Núñez de Balboa encountered about forty Indigenous men dressed as women. He commanded his soldiers to execute them through making them prey for their war dogs, which were specially bred mastiffs or greyhounds. They were dismembered and eaten alive by the dogs. Third gender people from around the area were rounded up in service of Spanish authority. Miranda writes that "the Spanish had made it clear that to tolerate, harbor, or associate with the third gender meant death."

In his 1775 memoir, Spanish soldier Pedro Fages wrote that about two or three joyas could be identified in each Indigenous Californian village and were "held in great esteem" in their communities. Fages sought to initiate a swift reduction of the joyas, writing "we place our trust in God and expect that these accursed people will disappear with the growth of the missions. The abominable vice will be eliminated to the extent that the Catholic faith and all the other virtues are firmly implanted there, for the glory of God and the benefit of those poor ignorants."

== By region ==
=== Europe ===
In Europe, there are many different types of gendercide.

Most recent instances of mass gendercide in Europe have resulted from sociopolitical motions, as "military strategies". For example, during the 1999 war in Kosovo, "battle age" ethnic-Albanian men were detained and killed in mass as a part of a "Serb military strategy".

Historically, from the 15th to the 18th century, girls, women, and some men fell victim to the frenzied cultural phenomena of witch-hunts. It is estimated that upwards of 100,000 trials took place, and from those trials, 60,000 individuals were executed.

Individual instances of gendercide also continue to permeate European society, ranging to individual murders, honor killings, to war-related deaths.

=== Asia ===
When compared to Europe, Asia has a staggeringly different sex-ratio. In Qatar, a middle-eastern country, there are a reported 299 males for every 100 females. The ratio is primarily due to large immigrant populations of largely male temporary workers or the pervading cultural sentiment of males being more desirable than females. Men are seen as more useful, and women as costly burdens. Such sentiments have led to increased rates of female infanticide across the continent, especially in countries such as India.

And though honor killings occur everywhere, they occur most commonly in Asian countries like India and Pakistan as well as in Bangladeshi diasporas. Experts explain that such murders are performed in order to protect the cultural concept of familial honor; things dishonorable enough to warrant such actions can include sexuality, divorce, and gender identity.

=== Africa ===
Gendercide across Africa is as ranged as any other continent. Gendercide through systematic governmental efforts have been carried out across African countries over the centuries. For example, there exists the Rwandan genocide in which 800,000 were killed, and 250,000 girls and women were systematically raped by individuals infected with HIV/AIDs virus, resulting in even more death, and a continued issue with the disease even to this day.

Gendercide also exists in Africa through the form of female genital mutilation–a procedure performed on both infants and girls that can result in numerous immediate and longterm complications and even death.

Similarly to Europe, witch-hunts prove a form of gendercide across Africa. It is reported that both men and women fall victim to witch-hunts, but women are more heavily targeted.

== See also ==
- Crime of passion
- Male expendability
- Femicide
  - Female foeticide in India
  - Female infanticide in China
- Intersex infanticide
  - Genetic diagnosis of intersex
- Feminism
- Gender disappointment
- Genocide
  - Genocidal rape
- Honor killing
- Misogynist terrorism
- Missing women
- Wartime sexual violence
- Witch-hunt
- Women and religion
- Girl power
- Women's rights
  - Women's empowerment
- Infanticide
- Daughter preference
- Single-gender world
- Matrubhoomi: A Nation Without Women
- Y: The Last Man
- Antifeminism
- Incel
- Manosphere
- Men's rights movement
- Son preference
