= Female infanticide =

Deliberate killing of newborn female children

Female infanticide is the deliberate killing of newborn female children. Female infanticide is prevalent in several nations around the world. It has been argued that the low status in which women are viewed in patriarchal societies creates a bias against females. The modern practice of sex-selective abortion is also used to regulate gender ratios.

In 1978, anthropologist Laila Williamson, in a summary of data she had collated on how widespread infanticide was, found that infanticide had occurred on every continent and was carried out by groups ranging from hunter gatherers to highly developed societies, and that, rather than this practice being an exception, it has been commonplace. The practice has been documented among the Indigenous peoples of Australia, Northern Alaska and South Asia, and Barbara Miller argues the practice to be "almost universal", even in the Western world. Miller contends that female infanticide is commonplace in regions where women are not employed in agriculture and regions in which dowries are the norm. In 1871, in The Descent of Man, and Selection in Relation to Sex, Charles Darwin wrote that the practice was commonplace among the aboriginal tribes of Australia. Female infanticide is also closely linked to a lack of education and high poverty rates, and is highly prevalent in locations such as India, Pakistan, and West Africa.

In 1990, Amartya Sen writing in the New York Review of Books estimated that there were 100 million fewer women in Asia than would be expected, and that this number of "missing" women "tell[s] us, quietly, a terrible story of inequality and neglect leading to the excess mortality of women".

== Regional occurrence ==
=== China ===
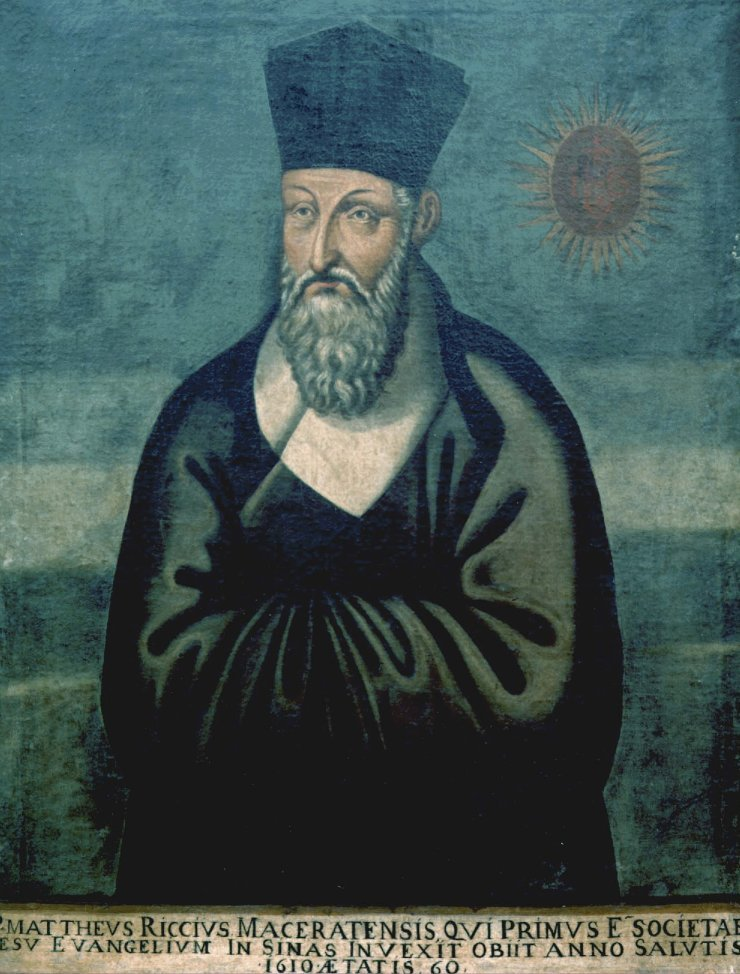
Matteo Ricci

China has a history of female infanticide spanning 2,000 years. With the arrival of Christian missionaries in the late sixteenth century, the missionaries discovered female infanticide was being practiced – newborns were seen thrown into rivers or onto rubbish piles. In the seventeenth century, Matteo Ricci documented that the practice occurred in several of China's provinces and that the primary reason for the practice was poverty.

In 19th-century China, female infanticide was widespread. Readings from Qing texts show a prevalence of the term nì nǚ ("to drown girls"), as drowning was the common method used to kill female children. Other methods used were suffocation and starvation. (Note: "As soon as the little girls are born, they are plunged into the water in order to drown them or force is applied to their bodies in order to suffocate them or they are strangled with human hands. And something even more deplorable is that there are servants who place the girl in the chamber pot or in the basin used for the birth, which is still filled with water and blood and, shut away there, they die miserably. And what is even more monstrous is that if the mother is not cruel enough to take the life of her daughter, then her father-in-law, mother-in-law, or husband agitates her by their words to kill the girl.") Leaving a child exposed to the elements was another method of killing an infant: the child would be placed in a basket which was then placed in a tree. Buddhist nunneries created "baby towers" for people to leave a child; it is however unclear as to whether the child was being left for adoption or if it had already died and was being left for burial. In 1845 in the province of Jiangxi, a missionary wrote that these children survived for up to two days while exposed to the elements, and that those passing by would pay no attention.

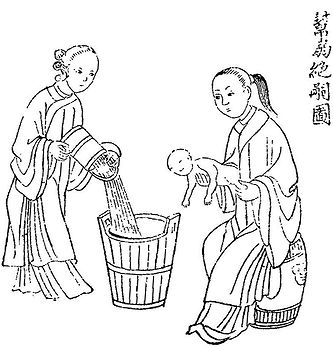
Chinese anti infanticide tract circa 1800.

The majority of China's provinces practiced female infanticide during the 19th century. In 1878, French Jesuit missionary Gabriel Palatre collected documents from 13 provinces, and the Annales de la Sainte-Enfance (Annals of the Holy Childhood) also found evidence of infanticide in Shanxi and Sichuan. According to the information collected by Palatre, the practice was more widely spread in the southeastern provinces and in the Lower Yangzi River region.

In China, the practice of female infanticide was not wholly condoned. Buddhism in particular was quite forceful in its condemnation of it. Buddhists wrote that the killing of young girls would bring bad karma; conversely, those who saved a young girl's life either through intervening or through presents of money or food would earn good karma, leading to a prosperous life, a long life and success for their sons. However the Buddhist belief in reincarnation meant that the death of an infant was not final, as the child would be reborn; this belief eased the guilt felt over female infanticide.

The Confucian attitude towards female infanticide was conflicted. By placing value on age over youth, Confucian filial piety lessened the value of children. The Confucian emphasis on the family led to increasing dowries which in turn led to a girl being far more expensive to raise than a boy, causing families to feel they could not afford as many daughters. The Confucian custom of keeping the male within the family meant that the money spent on a daughter's upbringing along with the dowry would be lost when she married, and as such girls were called "money-losing merchandise". Conversely the Confucian belief of Ren led Confucian intellectuals to support the idea that female infanticide was wrong and that the practice would upset the balance between yin and yang.

A white paper published by the Chinese government in 1980 stated that the practice of female infanticide was a "feudalistic evil". (Note: "Infanticide through drowning and abandoning female babies is an evil custom left over from feudal times.") The state's official position on the practice is that it is a carryover from feudal times, and is not a result of the states one-child policy. Jing-Bao Nie argues however that it would be "inconceivable" to believe there is no link between the state's family planning policies and female infanticide.

=== India ===
A map of India's child sex ratio, 2011.

The dowry system in India is one given reason for female infanticide; over a time period spanning centuries it has become embedded within Indian culture. Although the state has taken steps (Note: Although the Dowry Prohibition Act was passed in 1961 it had the consequence of young brides then being killed.) to abolish the dowry system, the practice persists, and for poorer families in rural regions female infanticide and gender selective abortion is attributed to the fear of being unable to raise a suitable dowry and then being socially ostracized.

In 1789, during British colonial rule in India the British discovered that female infanticide in Uttar Pradesh was openly acknowledged. A letter from a magistrate who was stationed in the North West of India during this period spoke of the fact that for several hundred years no daughter had ever been raised in the strongholds of the Rajahs of Mynpoorie. In 1845, however the ruler at that time did keep a daughter alive after a district collector named Unwin intervened. A review of scholarship has shown that the majority of female infanticides in India during the colonial period occurred for the most part in the North West, and that although not all groups carried out this practice, it was indeed widespread. In 1870, after an investigation by the colonial authorities the practice was made illegal, with the Female Infanticide Prevention Act, 1870.

According to women's rights activist Donna Fernandes, some practices are so deeply embedded within Indian culture it is "almost impossible to do away with them", and she has said that India is undergoing a type of "female genocide". The United Nations has declared that India is the most deadly country for female children, and that in 2012, female children aged between 1 and 5 were 75 percent more likely to die as opposed to boys. The children's rights group CRY has estimated that of the 12 million females born yearly in India, 1 million will have died within their first year of life. During British rule, the practice of female infanticide in the Indian state of Tamil Nadu among the Kallars and the Todas was reported. More recently in June 1986, it was reported by India Today in a cover story Born to Die that female infanticide was still in practice in Usilampatti in southern Tamil Nadu. The practice was mostly prevalent among the dominant caste of the region, Kallars.

=== Pakistan ===
Despite this practice being punishable according to Islamic law, there have been cases of female infanticide in Pakistan due to a few reasons, for example, children being born out of wedlock and then killed to avoid the stigma of illegitimacy. Pakistan is still a male-dominated nation and remains a patriarchal society. In addition, the boys in the family are given preferential treatment, receiving food and medical care before the girls do. Having a child out of wedlock in Pakistan is culturally taboo. When women give birth to their babies, they often kill them to escape the shame or persecution. However, the ratio of female babies being killed in these cases is much higher than the boys because boys are much more valued. Infanticide is illegal in Pakistan. However, people do not report these cases, making it impossible for police to investigate and prosecute. According to National Right to Live News, in 2017, only one case was actually reported, but 345 babies were found dead in Pakistan's capital between January 2017 and Spring of 2018.

== Socio-economics ==
Eliminating females poses an issue, as this reduces the number of females that will be able to bear children. It also poses an issue with feelings of female worth, as families wanting to eradicate female babies teach the young girls in their society that they are inferior to the opposite sex, making it more likely that they have problems of lacking self-confidence and esteem. The dowry system has an effect on the families and poverty line, as some families struggle to pay a dowry while earning below the minimum wage.

As of 2017, Pakistani women earn less than their male counterparts, earning under a hundred rupees a month, and are often unable to receive an education that would allow them to have better working hours and pay. Some are also restricted to only working within the home, while men are allowed to do the majority of crop work and herding.

In many countries, female infanticide is associated with socio-economic struggles. A study done in India found three socio-economic reasons associated with female infanticide. The study found that economic utility indicates that boys are valued more than girls due to the fact that boys can work and bring in money to the household. Due to the sociocultural utility factor of female infanticide, for many cultures having a boy in the family is mandatory in order to carry out the legacy of the family line. There is also a religious factor in female infanticide. Many believe that men are the only ones that can provide, and sons are viewed as mandatory in order to kindle the funeral pyre of their late parents and to assist in the soul's salvation.

== Solutions and programs ==
Non-Government Developmental Organizations (NGDOs) have gender awareness policies designed to prevent female discrimination all over the world. These NGDOs approach corporations in an attempt to educate those in the workforce on the pressing challenges women in society face. Other than increasing education regarding this issue, another noteworthy solution to female infanticide involves targeting the dowry system. Many societies oppose female children because of the heavy cost of dowry they would have to incur for a female. By reducing the financial burden on families, the eradication of the dowry system could therefore potentially reduce the apparent preference of male children as well as female infanticide rates.

Another way of decreasing female infanticide rates is by providing families with incentives to give birth to females. India's Girl Child Protection Scheme is one such scheme that encourages female births by providing families with financial support if they give birth to female children and additional support to those families whose children receive an education. This improves female literacy rates and increases female participation in the workforce, reducing female foeticide rates in underdeveloped countries.

Implementing gender education within schools and the workplace will add to gender neutrality within society, increasing the value of women. Sympathizing with women's suffrage in countries limiting women's rights will add to the battle in which women fight for freedoms in their home state. Building upon gender equality in education and teaching women strategies to cope with their situations will help them grow confidence and want to spread their knowledge and passions with their female children. The issue with female infanticide is that women devalue their own gender. When mothers give away their female children, it only adds to the lesser image of women. Having women respect themselves and their own children for who they are will increase the population, and it will increase the value of women. It may take a long time to implement these changes in society, but societal revision is a slow process. Education, value in life, and passion for gender are all aspects of decreasing female infanticide. Having locations to help a female child, such as "The Girl Child Protection Scheme", appears as a step toward change. This program only adds to the availability and opportunity for female infanticide. Instrumentalizing gender education and value of life will greatly inspire change in societies that participate in such process of termination.

== Consequences and reactions ==
As a result of large high female infanticide rates in countries, the population is often skewed with a larger proportion of males. According to the United Nations, this surplus of men in society coincides with increasing rates of child abuse, domestic violence, and bride trafficking/kidnapping, presenting a grave threat to the security of women in the affected areas. This also increases the likelihood of women becoming victims of harmful sexually transmitted diseases, which further adversely affects their lives as well as population rates. Owing to these concerning issues, there is also a concerning boost in maternal mortality rates and an increase in mental health conditions among women in these locations.

The Geneva Centre for the Democratic Control of Armed Forces (DCAF) wrote in their 2005 report, Women in an Insecure World, that at a time when the number of casualties in war had fallen, a "secret genocide" was being carried out against women. According to DCAF the demographic shortfall of women who have died for gender related issues is in the same range as the 191 million estimated dead from all conflicts in the twentieth century. In 2012, the documentary It's a Girl: The Three Deadliest Words in the World was released, and in one interview, an Indian woman claimed she had killed eight of her daughters.

== See also ==
- Dowry death
- Femicide
- Gendercide
- Missing women
- Sex ratio in India

== Bibliography ==
- Cave-Browne, John (1857). Indian infanticide: its origin, progress, and suppression. W. H. Allen & Co.
- Darwin, Charles (1871). The Descent of Man: And Selection in Relation to Se (Volume 2 ed.). John Murray.
- Einarsdóttir, Jónína (2004). Tired of Weeping: Mother Love, Child Death, and Poverty in Guinea-Bissau (2nd Revised ed.). University of Wisconsin Press. ISBN 978-0299201340.
- George, Sabu M. (1997). "Female Infanticide in Tamil Nadu, India: From Recognition Back to Denial?". Reproductive Health Matters. 5 (10): 124–132. CiteSeerX 10.1.1.621.2553. doi:10.1016/S0968-8080(97)90093-8. JSTOR 3775470.
- Harrison, Henrietta (2008). "A penny for the little Chinese: The French Holy Childhood Association in China, 1843- 1951" (PDF). American Historical Review. 113 (1): 72–92. doi:10.1086/ahr.113.1.72. S2CID 163110059.
- Jones, Adam (1999–2000). "Case Study: Female Infanticide". Gendercide.org.
- Krishnan, Murali (20 March 2012). Shamil Shams (ed.). "Female infanticide in India mocks claims of progress". Deutsche Welle.
- Mashru, Ram (18 January 2012). "It's a girl: The three deadliest words in the world". The Independent. Archived from the original on 12 December 2013.
- Mungello, D. E. (2009). The Great Encounter of China and the West, 1500–1800 (3rd ed.). Rowman & Littlefield. ISBN 978-0-7425-5797-0.
- Mungello, D. E. (2008). Drowning Girls in China: Female Infanticide in China since 1650. Rowman & Littlefield. ISBN 978-0742555310.
- Michael, Marc; King, Lawrence; Guo, Liang; McKee, Martin; Richardson, Erica; Stuckler, David (2013). "The Mystery of Missing Female Children in the Caucasus: An Analysis of Sex Ratios by Birth Order". International Perspectives on Sexual and Reproductive Health. 39 (2): 097–102. doi:10.1363/3909713. PMID 23895886.
- Milner, Larry S. (2000). Hardness of Heart/Hardness of Life: The Stain of Human Infanticide. University Press Of America. ISBN 978-0761815785.
- Miller, Barbara D. (1987). Nancy Scheper-Hughes (ed.). Child Survival: Anthropological Perspectives on the Treatment and Maltreatment of Children. Springer. ISBN 978-1556080289.
- Nie, Jing-Bao (2005). Behind the Silence: Chinese Voices on Abortion. Rowman & Littlefield. ISBN 978-0742523715.
- Oberman, Michelle (2005). "A Brief History of Infanticide and the Law". In Margaret G. Spinelli (ed.). Infanticide Psychosocial and Legal Perspectives on Mothers Who Kill (1st ed.). American Psychiatric Publishing. ISBN 978-1-58562-097-5.
- Parrot, Andrea; Cummings, Nina (2006). Forsaken Females: The Global Brutalization of Women. Rowman & Littlefield. ISBN 978-0742545793.
- Sayah, Reza (20 July 2011). "Killing of infants on the rise in Pakistan". CNN. Archived from the original on July 20, 2011.
- Winkler, Theodor H. (2005). "Slaughtering Eve The Hidden Gendercide" ( (PDF)). Women in an Insecure World. Geneva Centre for the Democratic Control of Armed Forces. Archived from the original on 2019-10-07.
