= Hast Khewa =

Hast Khewa is a town and Union Council of Chiniot District in the Punjab province of Pakistan. It is part of Chiniot Tehsil. It is situated 25 km away from Makhdoom interchange M2 Motorway at Kalowal Road. It is well known for political and religious personalities as Syed Ameer Hussain Marhoom, Syed Kaleem Ameer, Molana Aslam Raza Abdi and Malik Ashter Khan.

Syed Ameer Hussain has been a popular politician of Chiniot. Asif Ali Zardari and Benazir Bhutto visited Hast Khewa in 1995. Now Syed Kaleem Ali Ameer, Son of Syed Ameer Hussain, is a name in politics. He is Ticket holder of PPP for Provincial Assembly. Famous social worker brothers, Maalik Ushter and Abu Zar Ghaffari, also belong to Hast Khewa.
