= Daughter preference =

Cultural preference for female offspring

Daughter preference describes human families seeking to bear and raise daughters, rather than sons. It is unclear whether this phenomenon is due to their greater preference for daughters or a specific antipathy toward sons.

Daughter preference is evident in contemporary Japan and Japanese-American immigrant families. South Korea has also demonstrated a measurable shift from son preference to daughter preference. Daughter preference appears at measurable levels in three Scandinavian countries: Denmark, Norway, and Sweden; as well as the Eastern European nations of the Czech Republic, Estonia, and Hungary. Study found that a significant contributing factor to daughter preference was the "number of wife's sisters." In the matrilineal inheritance system of Malawi, daughter preference emerges if all existing children are sons.

Daughter preference or son preference is sometimes expressed by higher levels of household investment in offspring of preferred gender.
