= Female Infanticide Prevention Act, 1870 =

Legislative act in British India

Governor-General of India in Council
- Long title: An Act for the Prevention of the murder of Female Infants .
- Citation: Act VIII of 1870
- Enacted by: Governor-General of India in Council
- Enacted: 18 March 1870
- Commenced: 20 March 1870

Repealed by
- Act 48 of 1952
- Status: Repealed

The Female Infanticide Prevention Act, 1870 (Act VIII of 1870) was a legislative act passed in British India, to prevent murder of female infants.

Section 7 of this act declared that it was initially applicable only to the territories of Oudh, North-Western Provinces and Punjab, but the Act authorized the Governor General to extend the law to any other district or province of the British Raj at his discretion.

== Text ==
The British colonial authorities passed the Female Infanticide Prevention Act, 1870 under pressure of Christian missionaries and social reformers seeking an end to female infanticides in the Indian subcontinent. The law's preamble stated that the murder of female infants is believed to be commonly committed in certain parts of British India, and these were Oudh, North-Western Provinces and Punjab. The act initially applied to these regions.

The law authorized the creation of a police force to maintain birth, marriage and death registers, to conduct census of the district at its discretion, enforce a special tax on the district to pay for the expenses and entertainment of said police officers.

The act also stipulated a prison sentence of six months or a fine of thirty thousand rupees, or both, on anyone who disobeyed or obstructed the police officers enforcing the act. Section 6 of the act allowed the police officer to seize a child from any person he suspects may neglect or endanger any female child, as well as force collect a monthly fee from that person.

== Current status ==
The Indian practice of female infanticide and of sex-selective abortion have been cited to explain in part a gender imbalance that has been reported as being increasingly distorted since the 1991 Census of India, although other influences might also affect the trend.

The Act was in force until 1981 in Pakistan, when it was superseded by an ordinance.
