= Social privilege =

Theory of advantage or entitlement

Social privilege is an advantage or entitlement that benefits individuals belonging to a particular identity. Privileged groups can be advantaged based on social class, wealth, education, caste, age, height, skin color, physical fitness, nationality, geographic location, cultural differences, ethnic or racial category, gender, gender identity, neurodiversity, physical disability, sexual orientation, religion, and other differentiating factors. Individuals can be privileged in one area, such as education, and not privileged in another area, such as health. The amount of privilege any individual has may change over time and location, such as when a person becomes disabled, or when a child becomes a young adult.

The concept of privilege is generally considered to be a theoretical concept used in a variety of subjects and often linked to social inequality. Privilege is also linked to social and cultural forms of power. It began as an academic concept but has since been invoked more widely outside of academia. This subject is based on the interactions of different forms of privilege within certain situations. It can be understood as the inverse of social inequality, in that it focuses on how power structures in society aid societally privileged people, as opposed to how those structures oppress others.

== History ==
=== Writings of W. E. B. Du Bois ===
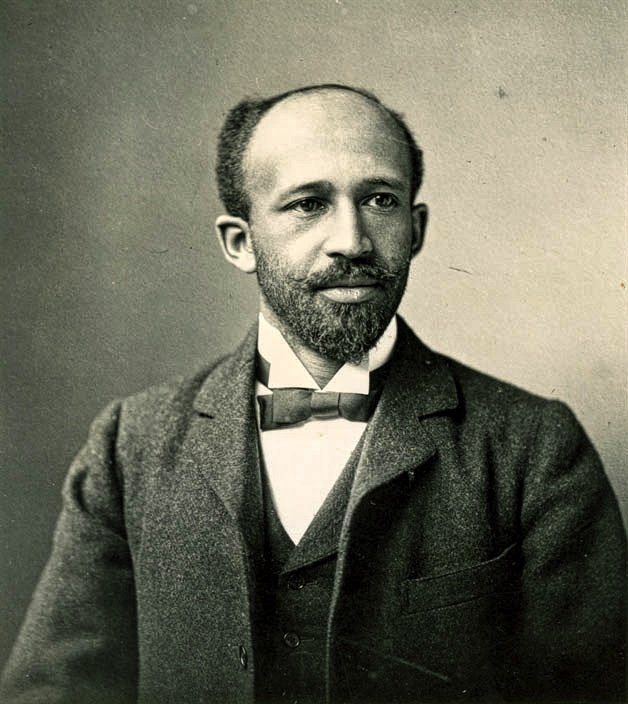
W. E. B. Du Bois, the author of The Souls of Black Folk (1903)

The history of privilege as a concept dates back to American sociologist and historian W. E. B. Du Bois's 1903 book The Souls of Black Folk. Here, he wrote that although African Americans were observant of white Americans and conscious of racial discrimination, white Americans did not think much about African-Americans, nor about the effects of racial discrimination. In 1935, Du Bois wrote about what he called the "wages of whiteness" held by white Americans. He wrote that these included courtesy and deference, unimpeded admittance to all public functions, lenient treatment in court, and access to the best schools.

=== Codification of the concept ===
Early concepts that would lead to the term White Privilege were developed by the Weather Underground in the 1960s.

In 1988, American feminist and anti-racism activist Peggy McIntosh published "White Privilege and Male Privilege: A Personal Account of Coming to See Correspondences through Work in Women's Studies". Here, McIntosh documented forty-six privileges which she, as a white person, experienced in the United States. As an example, "I can be sure that if I need legal or medical help, my race will not work against me", and "I do not have to educate my children to be aware of systemic racism for their own daily physical protection". McIntosh described white privilege as an "invisible package of unearned assets" which white people do not want to acknowledge, and which leads to them being confident, comfortable, and oblivious about racial issues, while non-white people become unconfident, uncomfortable, and alienated. McIntosh's essay has been credited for stimulating academic interest in privilege, which has been extensively studied in the decades since.

== Overview ==
Historically, academic study of social inequality focused mainly on the ways in which minority groups were discriminated against, and ignored the privileges accorded to dominant social groups. That changed in the late 1980s, when researchers began studying the concept of privilege.

Privilege, as understood and described by researchers, is a function of multiple variables of varying importance, such as race, age, gender, sexual orientation, gender identity, neurology, citizenship, religion, physical ability, health, level of education, and others. Race and gender tend to have the highest impacts given that one is born with these characteristics and they are immediately visible. However, religion, sexuality and physical ability are also highly relevant. Some such as social class are relatively stable and others, such as age, wealth, religion and attractiveness, will or may change over time. Some attributes of privilege are at least partly determined by the individual, such as level of education, whereas others such as race or class background are entirely involuntary.

American sociologist Michael S. Kimmel uses the metaphor of a wind to explain the concept. He explains that when you walk into the wind you have to struggle for each step that you take. When you walk with the wind, you do not feel the wind at all but you still move faster than you would otherwise. The wind is social privilege and if it flows with you, it simply propels you forward with little effort of your own.

In the context of the theory, privileged people are considered to be "the norm", and, as such, gain invisibility and ease in society, with others being cast as inferior variants. Privileged people see themselves reflected throughout society both in mass media and face-to-face in their encounters with teachers, workplace managers and other authorities, which researchers argue leads to a sense of entitlement and the assumption that the privileged person will succeed in life, as well as protecting the privileged person from worry that they may face discrimination from people in positions of authority.

== Awareness of privilege ==
Some academics, such as Peggy McIntosh, highlight a pattern of privilege in which those who benefit, often overlook. The argument may follow that such a denial constitutes a further injustice against those who do not benefit from the same form of privilege. Derald Wing Sue has referred to such denial as a form of "microaggression" or microinvalidation that negates the experiences of people who do not have privilege and minimizes the impediments they face.

McIntosh wrote that most people are reluctant to acknowledge their privilege, and instead look for ways to justify or minimize the effects of privilege stating that their privilege was fully earned. They justify this by acknowledging the acts of individuals of unearned dominance, but deny that privilege is institutionalized as well as embedded throughout our society. She wrote that those who believe privilege is systemic may nonetheless deny having personally benefited from it, and may oppose efforts to dismantle it. According to researchers, privileged individuals resist acknowledging their privileges because doing so would require them to acknowledge that whatever success they have achieved did not result solely through their own efforts. Instead it was partly due to a system that has developed to support them. The concept of privilege calls into question the idea that society is a meritocracy, which researchers have argued is particularly unsettling for Americans for whom belief that they live in a meritocracy is a deeply held cultural value, and one that researchers commonly characterize as a myth.

In The Gendered Society, Michael Kimmel wrote that when people at all levels of privilege do not feel personally powerful, arguments that they have benefited from unearned advantages seem unpersuasive.

Catherine D'Ignazio and Lauren Klein in their book Data Feminism used the term privilege hazard when referring to the phenomenon where individuals in privileged positions remain unaware of their inherent advantages. This lack of awareness perpetuates societal inequalities and obstructs efforts to advocate for marginalized groups. Privilege hazard is cited by other authors to acknowledge their positionality and risk of misinterpretating others' experiences. Authors such as Felicia Pratto, Andrew Stewart, Peggy McIntosh and Taylor Phillips have contributed to this discourse by examining various forms of privilege hazards, including group dominance, white, male and class privilege. This exploration sheds light on how privilege manifests in different societal spheres and its implications for marginalized communities.

In their exploration of Data Feminism, Catherine D'Ignazio and Lauren Klein define "privilege hazard" as the potential risks arising when privileged individuals, equipped with access to resources and data, attempt to address issues faced by marginalized groups. Relying solely on data may reinforce existing power dynamics. Software and data developers with privilege hazard may misinterpret data from contexts they don't understand. The consequences may further marginalizing disadvantaged communities. To counter this, they advocate for an inclusive approach to data practices that centers on marginalized voices, aiming for a more equitable and just data ecosystem.

The continuous presence of privilege hazard is evident in the concept of group dominance, wherein one social group holds significant advantages over others, leading to the consolidation of power and resources. Pratto and Stewart's research emphasizes that dominant groups often lack awareness of their privileged identities, viewing them as normal rather than as privileges. Kaidi Wu and David Dunning delve into hypocognition within group dominance privilege, highlighting how individuals from dominant groups may struggle to grasp the difficulties faced by minorities due to lack of exposure.

== Examples ==
=== Educational racism ===
Racism is the belief that groups of humans possess different behavioral traits corresponding to physical appearance and can be divided based on the superiority of one race over another. This can result in particular ethnic and cultural groups having privileged access to a multitude of resources and opportunities, including education and work positions.

Educational racism has been entrenched in American society since the creation of the United States of America. A system of laws in the 18th and 19th century known as the Black Codes, criminalized the access to education for black people. Until the introduction of the Thirteenth Amendment to the United States Constitution, the Fourteenth Amendment to the United States Constitution and the Civil Rights Act of 1866, seeking out an education was punishable by the law for them. This thus served to keep African Americans illiterate and only value them as a workforce. However, even after these institutional and legal changes, African Americans were still targeted by educational racism in the form of school segregation in the United States. In the 20th century the fight against educational racism reached its climax with the landmark Supreme Court case Brown v. Board of Education.

Educational racism also took other forms throughout history such as the creation of Canadian Indian residential school system in 1831, which forcefully integrated indigenous children into schools aimed at erasing their ethnic, linguistic and cultural specificities in order to assimilate them into a white settler society. Until the last residential school closed in 1996, Canada had an educational system which specifically harmed and targeted indigenous children. An estimated 6,000 children died under that system.

Nowadays the opportunity gap pinpoints how educational racism is present in societies. The term refers to "the ways in which race, ethnicity, socioeconomic status, English proficiency, community wealth, familial situations, or other factors contribute to or perpetuate lower educational aspirations, achievement, and attainment for certain groups of students." In other words, it is "the disparity in access to quality schools and the resources needed for all children to be academically successful." Concretely this can be seen in the United States by considering how, according to the Schott Foundation's Opportunity to Learn Index, "students from historically disadvantaged families have just a 51 percent Opportunity to Learn when compared to White, non-Latino students."

According to McKinley et al.

Students of color are pushed toward academic failure and continued social disenfranchisement. Racist policies and beliefs, in part, explain why children and young adults from racially marginalized groups fail to achieve academically at the same rate as their White peers.

=== Heterosexual privilege ===
Heterosexual privilege can be defined as "the rights and unearned advantages bestowed on heterosexuals in society". There are both institutional and cultural forces encouraging heterosexuality in society. Sexual orientation is a repeated romantic, sexual or emotional attraction to one or multiple genders. There are a variety of categories including heterosexual, gay, lesbian, and bisexual. Heterosexual is considered the normative form of sexual orientation.

Heterosexual privilege is based in the existence of homophobia in society, particularly at the individual level. Between 2014 and 2018, 849 sexual orientation related hate crimes were committed in Canada. Despite the fact that Canada legalized same-sex marriage in 2005 and has enshrined the protection of the human rights of all people of all sexual orientations, there is still societal bias against those who do not conform to heterosexuality.

Beyond this, institutions such as marriage stop homosexual partners from accessing each other's health insurance, tax benefits or adopting a child together. Same sex marriage is legal in only 27 countries, mostly in the northern hemisphere. This results in an inability for non-heterosexual couples to benefit from the institutional structures that are based on heterosexuality, resulting in privilege for those who are heterosexual.

=== Racial privilege ===
Peggy McIntosh and scholars like Brian Lowery and Taylor Phillips discuss white privilege, highlighting the unseen benefits white individuals enjoy due to their race. McIntosh describes it as an invisible knapsack of unearned advantages, leading to limited perspectives and empathy towards marginalized groups. Taylor Phillips and Brian Lowery's research further elaborates on how whites tend to hide their privilege from themselves, maintaining the status quo and hindering progress toward equity.

=== Male privilege ===
Male privilege encompasses the advantages men experience solely due to their gender. Peggy McIntosh notes that males are conditioned not to recognize their privilege, leading to obliviousness and perpetuation of the privilege hazard. Real-life examples, such as unequal distribution of household chores, illustrate how male privilege remains invisible to men due to societal norms.Tal Peretz expands on McIntosh's concept, questioning if men tend to overlook or critically examine their privilege.

=== Class privilege ===
Class privilege refers to the benefits individuals enjoy based on their social or economic status. Taylor Phillips and Brian Lowery's study reveals that when confronted with their privilege, individuals tend to defend themselves, attributing success to personal efforts rather than acknowledging systemic advantages. This defensive response shields individuals from accepting their unearned advantages, representing a form of privilege hazard. Shai Davaidai and Jacklyn Stein's works delve into perceptions of wealth and poverty, highlighting the impact of environments on individuals' views of their circumstances.

=== Other ===
- Body privilege
- Christian privilege
- First World privilege
- Passing Privilege

== Intersectionality ==
Privilege theory argues that each individual is embedded in a matrix of categories and contexts, and will be in some ways privileged and other ways disadvantaged, with privileged attributes lessening disadvantage and membership in a disadvantaged group lessening the benefits of privilege. This can be further supported by the idea of intersectionality, which was coined by Kimberle Crenshaw in 1989. When applying intersectionality to the concept of social privilege, it can be understood as the way one form of privilege can be mitigated by other areas in which a person lacks privilege, for example, a black man who has male privilege but no white privilege. It is also argued that members of privileged social identity groups often do not recognize their advantages.

Intersections of forms of identity can either enhance privilege or decrease its effects. Psychological analysis has found that people tend to frame their lives on different elements of their identity and therefore frame their lives through the privilege they do or do not have. However, this analysis also found that this framing was stronger amongst certain nationalities, suggesting that identity and privilege may be more central in certain countries. Often people construct themselves in relation to the majority, so ties to identity and therefore degrees of privilege can be stronger for more marginalized groups.

Forms of privilege one might have can actually be decreased by the presence of other factors. For example, the feminization of a gay man may reduce his male privilege in addition to already lacking heterosexual privilege. When acknowledging privilege, multifaceted situations must be understood individually. Privilege is a nuanced notion and an intersectional understanding helps bridge gaps in the original analysis.

== Criticism ==
The concept of privilege has been criticized for ignoring relative differences among groups. For example, Lawrence Blum argued that in American culture there are status differences among Chinese, Japanese, Indians, Koreans, and Cambodians, and among African Americans, black immigrants from the Caribbean, and black immigrants from Africa.

Blum agreed that privilege exists and is systemic yet nonetheless criticized the label itself, saying that the word "privilege" implies luxuries rather than rights, and arguing that some benefits of privilege such as unimpeded access to education and housing would be better understood as rights; Blum suggested that privilege theory should distinguish between "spared injustice" and "unjust enrichment" as some effects of being privileged are the former and others the latter. Blum also argued that privilege can end up homogenising both privileged and non-privileged groups when in fact it needs to take account the role of interacting effects and an individual's multiple group identities. "White privilege", Michael Monahan argued, would be more accurately described as the advantages gained by whites through historical disenfranchisement of non-whites rather than something that gives whites privilege above and beyond normal human status.

Psychologist Erin Cooley reported in a study published in 2019 that reading about white privilege decreased social liberals' sympathy for poor whites and increased their will to punish/blame but did not increase their sympathy for poor blacks.

The existence of privilege across various categories leads to variation in experiences within specific privileged groups, raising concerns about the legitimacy of privilege hazard. Jamie Abrams' article challenges the notion of privilege, discussing how efforts solely focused on highlighting male privilege may inadvertently reinforce existing cultural norms and fail to foster inclusivity. This perspective underscores the complexity of addressing systemic privilege, emphasizing the need to reshape societal norms and institutional structures. Herb Goldberg's book sheds light on how the idea of male privilege and power has hurt men's personal self-realization.

== See also ==
- Ableism
- Age stratification
- Attention inequality
- Caste
- Decadence
- Dominance hierarchy
- Dominant culture
- Double standard
- Horizontal inequality
- Identity politics
- Ingroups and outgroups
- Nobility
- Privilege (social inequality)
- Privilege hazard
- Reverse discrimination
- Social justice
- Social stratification
- Structural abuse
- Structural discrimination
- Structural violence
