= Femicide =

Murder of women or girls because of their gender

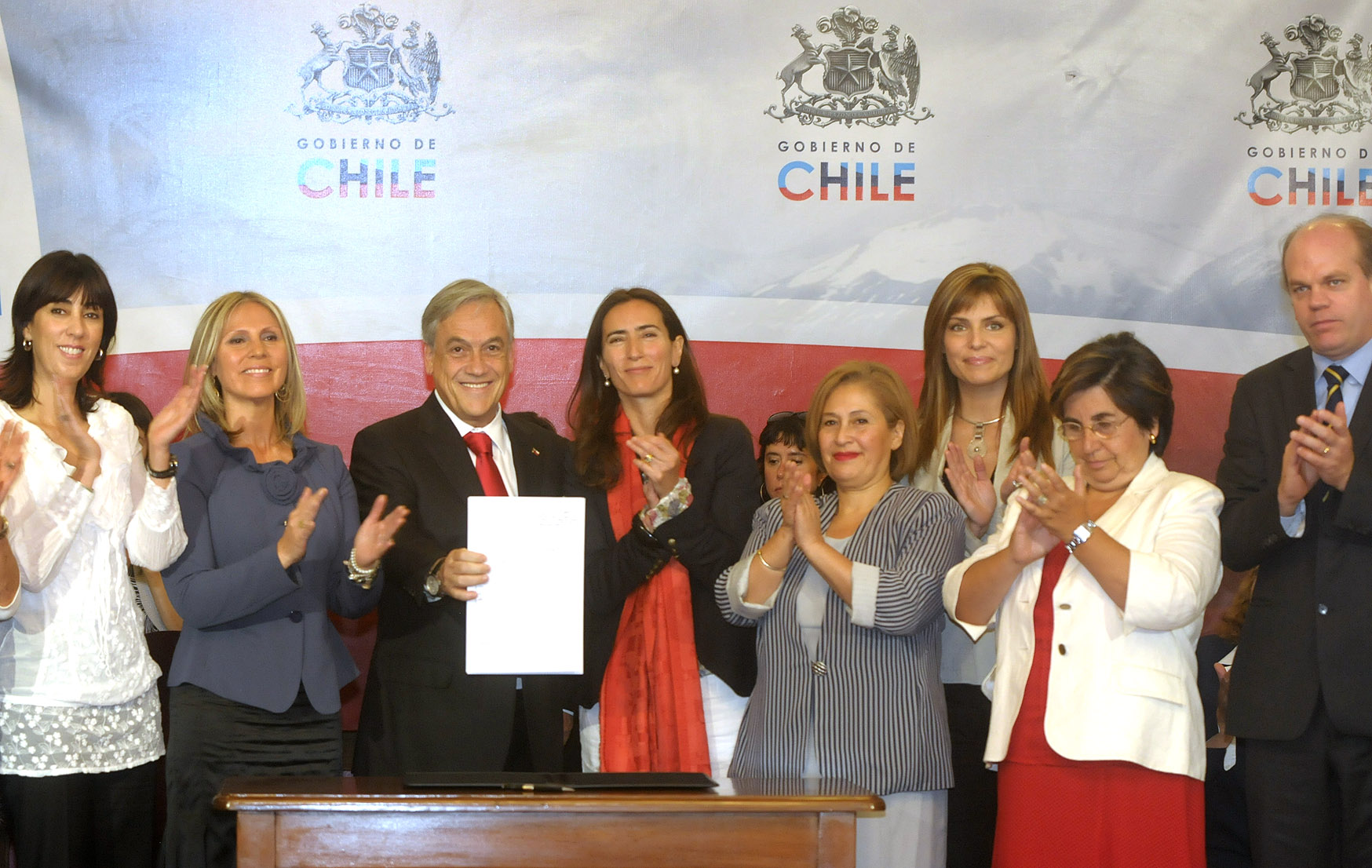
Declaration of the enactment of the law against femicide in Chile, 2010

Femicide, or feminicide, is the intentional murder of women or girls in which they are exclusively targeted because of their gender, or murder in which women or girls are disproportionately targeted. It is frequently committed as a method to control women and girls. Causes of femicide include jealousy, general hatred, revenge, male entitlement, harmful gender roles, gender stereotypes, cultural phenomenons such as so-called "honor killings" or female genital mutilation (particularly Type 3), as well as coercive control, stopping a pregnancy, social beliefs such as sati, and masculine hegemony that perpetuates the unequal power between men and women.

A spouse or a partner is responsible for almost 40% of femicides, or homicides of a female victim. Additionally, femicide may be underreported due to insufficient evidence. Femicide often includes domestic violence and forced abortions. Some cultures use gender-selective infanticide and geronticide to perform femicide.

Until recently, femicide was not considered a visible phenomenon, but awareness of it is gradually increasing.

== History ==
=== Development of the term ===
The term femicide was used in England in 1801 by John Corry to signify "the killing of a woman". In 1848, the term was published in Wharton's Law Lexicon.

The current usage arose with second-wave feminism, which aimed to raise female class consciousness and resistance against gender oppression. The term has been used to call attention to violence against women. US author Carol Orlock is credited with using the term in her unpublished anthology on femicide.

Diana Russell publicized the term in 1976 at the International Tribunal on Crimes against Women in Belgium. She wrote: "We must realize that a lot of homicide is femicide. We must recognize the sexual politics of murder. From the burning of witches in the past, to the more recent widespread custom of female infanticide in many societies, to the killing of women for 'honor,' we realize that femicide has been going on a long time. But since it involves mere females, there was no name for it until Carol Orlock invented the word 'femicide.'" She first implicitly defined the term as a hate killing of females by males, but then went on to redefine it as "the killing of females by males because they are female" in later years. Femicide remains understudied in scientific literature.

Femicide may also be 'intimate.' Intimate femicide can be identified as such by using "severity of violence, such as access to and threats with firearms, forced sex, threats to kill, and strangulation" to determine whether a case can be considered an act of femicide or not. The definition of femicide also relies on "inequalities in gender 'in terms of education, economic level, and employment'".

Female genital mutilation (FGM) is defined by the World Health Organization as "the removal of part or all of the external female genitalia and/or injury to the female genetic organs for cultural or other non-therapeutic reasons". Female genital mutilation results in femicide when women and girls die, due to unhygienic practices of FGM that result in infection or death, as well as the increased likelihood of contracting HIV/AIDS because of FGM.

=== Contemporary definitions by feminists ===
==== Definition by Diana Russell ====
South African feminist author Diana Russell narrows the definition of femicide to "the killing of females by males because they are female". Russell emphasizes that males commit femicide with sexist motives. She replaces "woman" with "female" to include girls and infants. Russell believes her definition of femicide applies to all forms of sexist murdering, whether motivated by misogyny (the hatred of females), a sense of superiority over females, sexual pleasure, or the assumption of ownership over women.

Russell says: "Femicide is on the extreme end of a continuum of antifemale terror that includes a wide variety of verbal and physical abuse, such as rape, torture, sexual slavery (particularly in prostitution), incestuous and extrafamilial child sexual abuse, physical and emotional battery, sexual harassment (on the phone, in the streets, at the office, and in the classroom), genital mutilation (clitoridectomies, excision, infibulations), unnecessary gynecological operations (gratuitous hysterectomies), forced heterosexuality, forced sterilization, forced motherhood (by criminalizing contraception and abortion), psychosurgery, denial of food to women in some cultures, cosmetic surgery, and other mutilations in the name of beautification. Whenever these forms of terrorism result in death, they become femicides."

She includes covert murdering of women as well, such as the mass murder of female babies due to male preference in cultures such as India and China, as well as deaths related to the failure of social institutions, such as the criminalization of abortion or the prevalence of female genital mutilation.

==== Other definitions ====
Diana Russell's definition is not accepted by all scholars. Jacquelyn Campbell and Carol Runyan use "femicide" to reference "all killings of women, regardless of motive or perpetrator status". They argue that motive cannot always be determined, and so must be removed from the qualification for femicide to gather data.

Feminists Desmond Ellis and Walter Dekesedery take a different approach, viewing the definition of femicide as "the intentional killing of females by males". They require that femicide be intentional, unlike the inclusion of covert femicide in Diana Russell's definition. Femicides are also identified "as 'slip-ups' in a power struggle in which men strive to control women and deprive them of their liberty and women struggle for autonomy".

South Asian feminists differ, stating that femicide is "the intentional killing of females by men, and of females by other females in the interests of men". Examples include neglect of female children in preference of males as well as dowry-related murder, where female in-laws murder women due to dowry disputes. Moreover, COST Action 1206 provides definitions of femicide.

These definitions distinguish femicide from non-gendered descriptions of murder and homicide. Instead, femicide exemplifies that women are murdered for different reasons and motives from those associated with typical descriptions of murder. Globally, femicide has seldom been investigated separately from homicide, and the goal of many of these authors is to make femicide a separate category. In 2013, COST set up Action IS-1206 entitled "Femicide across Europe".

Canada includes more than females under the term Femicide, including "women and girls, 2 Spirit, trans women and gender non-conforming individuals because of their gender"

=== From femicide to feminicide ===
Feminicide is a variant for femicide that can be found in official documentation of the United Nations. This term was first introduced in Spanish, when Marcela Lagarde y de los Ríos translated the term femicide as feminicidio in conversation with Diana Russell:

Cuando traduje el texto de Diana Russell, me tomé la libertad de modificar el concepto, ella lo llama femicide y entonces yo lo traduje desde hace ya varios años como feminicidio, precisamente para que no fuera a confundirse en castellano como femicidio u homicidio femenino; no, yo quería que fuera un concepto claro, distinto, para que entonces viniera junto con todo el contenido del concepto, que es, como ya lo expliqué, muy complejo. Diana Russell me dio permiso de usarlo así, traducido como feminicidio. Ella dice estar muy asombrada porque en ningún lado ha tenido el éxito que está teniendo en México y en América Latina su propuesta... [When I translated Diana Russell's text, I took the freedom of modifying the concept. She called it femicide and I translated it since a few years ago as femicidio, precisely to prevent the confusion with femicide or a feminine homicide; I wanted a concept that was clear, different, so that it could come along with all the content of the concept that is, as I have explained, very complex. Diana Russell gave me permission to use it in this way, translated as feminicide. She says she is very amazed because there is no other place where her proposal is having as much success as it does in Mexico and Latin America...]

The Latin American feminist perspective added amplified the concept with the local experience. In her book Counting Feminicide, Catherine D'Ignazio summarizes how the term went from femicide to feminicidio and, later, to feminicide. The author points out that Julia E. Monárrez Fragoso was the first to introduce the concept of femicide to name the violence that was taking place in Ciudad Juarez and how Lagarde moved the term forward by introducing it into Mexican legislature in 2003 and working until creating a law against feminicide in 2012:

In the process of her legislative work, Lagarde y de los Ríos built on the significant theoretical shifts introduced by Monárrez Fragoso in which feminicidio means both the killing of a woman or girl for gender-related reasons and also the linking of those killings to human rights violations and to the climate of impunity created by state inaction.

In this way, Lagarde defines feminicide as a state crime, to point out the how authorities participate in this crime by neglecting and silencing the situation in different moments of the process. This variant and the theoretical contributions from Latin America have been later incorporated into English by diverse authors as "activists, journalists, and academics based in the United States and Canada have taken note of the work on femicide and feminicide by their Latin American counterparts and traveled some of these concepts back into the English language". For example, Judith Butler uses the term and talks about Ni Una Menos, and Lauren Klein and D'Ignazio include it in their book Data Feminism.

== Causes ==
As defined by Diana Russell, femicide includes intimate partner femicide, lesbicide, racial femicide, serial femicide, mass femicide, honor killing, dowry-related murder, and more. Any act of sexual terrorism that results in death is considered femicide. Covert femicide also takes form in the criminalization of abortion in cases where the mother's life is at risk, intentional spread of HIV/AIDS, or death as a result of female genital mutilation.

The most widespread form of femicide in the world is that committed by an intimate partner of a female. This accounts for approximately 38.6 percent of all murders of women globally, which may be an undercount.

Different areas of the world experience femicide varyingly, i.e., the Middle East and South Asia have higher rates of honor killing: the murder of women by their family, due to an actual or assumed sexual or behavioral transgression, such as adultery, sexual intercourse, or even having been raped.

Systemic criminal justice issues such error of impunity and low crime clearance rates have been associated with femicide.

=== Among intimate partners ===
Intimate partner femicide, sometimes called intimate femicide, or romantic femicide, refers to the murdering of a woman by her intimate partner or her former intimate partner. Intimate partner femicide is often proceeded by intimate partner violence. In South Africa, a female prostitute that is killed by her client is also classified as intimate femicide irrespective of the duration of their sexual relationship.

5–8% of all murders committed by male perpetrators are cases of intimate partner homicide. For example, a 2020 examination from media and internet sources of every single murder of an elderly woman in Israel committed between 2006 and 2015 revealed that all the cases of female geronticide were intimate partner femicides, and perpetrated in the domestic arena.

Acts of incest, sexual harassment, rape, battering, and other forms of violence are also found to escalate over time within a familial relationship, possibly resulting in femicide. The prevalence of intimate partner femicide is said to dispel the myth that women have the most to fear from strangers, and instead are most often murdered within the private sphere of the home. Argued by Jacquelyn Campbell, a common motive that causes men to murder their intimate partners is jealousy, a result of male efforts to control and possess women to display ownership and reinforce patriarchy.

A "feminist reconceptualization" claims a structural system is to blame for the murder of women rather than violent individuals. It is cross-cultural structure on a mass scale, and is suggested to be considered as a human rights violation by the Women's Studies International Forum and considered a "crime against humanity." While authors acknowledge "crimes are committed by individuals and not by abstract entities", the prevalence of domestic violence constitutes an epidemic. Contemporary feminists believe that re-framing intimate partner violence as a state crime and a crime against humanity can help reduce violence against women committed by their significant others, as it is already recognized as a violation of the international human rights law.

There is considerable debate over whether men or women are more likely to commit intimate violence with studies from the US and UK finding large variations across race, age, and income.

Risk factors that increase the likelihood of intimate partner femicide include: when a male suffered physical abuse as a child, when a male has previously threatened to commit suicide or murder the woman if she cheats on him or leaves him, when there is elevated alcohol or drug abuse by either partner, or when a male attempts to control a woman's freedom. Two-fifths of intimate partner femicide is related to the use of intoxicants.

Other factors commonly associated with male perpetrators of femicide include gun ownership, forcing sexual intercourse, and unemployment. Women's risk factors include: if they are pregnant, have faced prior abuse from their partner, are estranged from their partner, or are attempting to leave a relationship, their likelihood of femicide increases. The presence of firearms within a home is a large factor in intimate partner femicide, and worldwide, firearms are used in one-third of all femicides.

As often reported in the public eye, male perpetrators are seen as "being driven" to commit femicide, due to a "breakdown in love attributed to the female". In defense trials, the defense of provocation is often used to reduce the time male murders serve in prison. Conversely, women are not often as successful with using this idea of provocation in their murder trials, and judges are statistically less likely to accept claims of self-defense.

Factors that decrease the risk of intimate partner femicide include a separate domicile for women and other societal factors, such as better policing, as well as mandated arrest for violation of restraining orders related to intimate partner violence. Karen D. Stout found that, in the US, there is a correlation between the number of women's shelters in a state, the number of rape crisis centers, and a lowered rate of femicide. One explanation of this correlation is that implementing these measures has positively affected lowering the femicide rate. Other effective legislation against femicide include legislation that defines civil injunction relief, defines physical abuse as a criminal offense', allows arrest without a warrant, requires data collection and reporting, and provides funds for women's shelters.

==== Gun violence ====
In the US, about 67% of the women murdered by their partners are murdered with a gun. Access to guns therefore plays an important role in this. On average, 70 American women are "shot and killed" by their intimate partner every month. Nechama Brodie, in her book Femicide in South Africa, indicates that more than 80% of femicide victims attacked by their partner were 'killed by a firearm injury, mostly from a single gunshot to the head or face ... In three-quarters of these cases, the perpetrator is a legal firearm owner using a licensed weapon.'

=== Racially motivated femicide ===
The Hope Movement defines racist femicide as the racially motivated murdering of women by men who are members of a different race. According to Diana Russell and fellow writer Jill Radford, "Racism interacts with violence against women, and shapes both femicide itself, and the ways it is addressed by the local community, the police, the media, and the legal system." Russell and Radford assert that when looking at femicide within the United States specifically, one must consider the politics of both sexism and racism in the murders of black women and the little justice that is often served.

Media coverage can especially exhibit bias when covering the murders of Black versus white women. Jaime Grant writes on the murder of 12 young women in Boston, Massachusetts, and exposes the "racism in media coverage, which virtually ignored these killings initially, and later depicted the victims in racist and sexist stereotypes, such as runaways, drug addicts, or prostitutes." In addition, police response and investigation can often differ based on the victim's race.

Engaging in work with Black Feminist Studies, author Manshel claims that the narrative which is formed around domestic violence is traditionally associated with a white, middle class, female victim, leaves victims of different races and social classes to receive unequal care, and it can also lead to more victimization of the woman who is murdered/abused due to not aligning with the vulnerability which is typically expected of female victims. Manshel also traces the history of assaults of Black women, and she makes the distinction that "the circumstances" of white victims were "wholly different" from those of "enslaved women" in the 19–20th century, and she proposes that anti-racist frameworks about sexual violence should be put into writing.

=== Sexually motivated (lesbophobic) femicide ===
According to Diana Russell and Jill Radford, lesbicide, also known as homophobic femicide, the murder of lesbians, has a long history as a legalized act. In Roman civilization, a married woman convicted of engaging in any sexual activity with another woman could be murdered by her husband as a "just penalty for her crime". In medieval Europe, secular and religious doctrines mandated death for lesbianism. "The famous 1260 Code of Orleans in France secularized the prohibition of lesbianism, mandating that for the first two offenses, a woman would 'lose her member'; for the third offense she would be burned." This doctrine persisted into the witch hunts of the 15th century, among whose perpetrators witchcraft was linked with heresy and homosexuality. The phrase femina cum feminus (woman with woman) was often an accusation in witch trials.

In the 21st century, lesbianism is no longer a capital crime, but it remains criminalized by many governments, and is condemned by most religions. Torture and murder of lesbians occur in every part of the world. According to Susan Hawthorne of Victoria University, "domination is exemplified in the punishment of lesbians as outsiders in patriarchal culture". Hawthorne goes on to elaborate that lesbians are often killed, tortured, or generally denied rights due to their invisibility in terms of political power and social representation: "When it comes to campaigns on violence against women, lesbians are either left out or included only in a footnote".

A case study conducted in 2014 analyzing multiple anti-LGBT cases of violence suggests that crimes like lesbicide can, in part, be explained by existing hyper-masculinity theories that observe the "accomplishment of gender" and that "constructing masculinity is relevant to bias crime offending". One common occurrence that sociological researchers have found is the escalation of violence towards LGBT members when they were met with "unwanted heterosexual advances".

==== Corrective rape ====
There are documented cases of corrective rape in South Africa, Zimbabwe, Ecuador, and Thailand. Corrective rape has led to death in some cases.

Corrective rape is defined by Hawthorne as a hate crime that constitutes forced sexual activity with a person who is either a woman, gender non-conforming, or identifies as something other than heterosexual e.g lesbian or asexual, whose goal is to "correct" the victim's sexual orientation and make them heterosexual or behave in a more gender-conforming manner.

Eudy Simelane was a famous soccer player who played for the South Africa women's national football team and an LGBTQ+ rights activist; her murder in 2008 was a highly publicized instance of simultaneous corrective rape and lesbicide in South Africa.

=== Transfemicide ===
Transfemicide or transfeminicide is defined as the killing of a trans woman motivated by transphobic, misogynistic and transmisogynistic hatred that has its origins in cissexist cultural and political norms. Journalists and academics alike believe the prevalence of transfemicide to be vastly underreported. Journalists Emma Landeros and Joel Aguirre argue that, as hate crimes, transfemicides constitute a 'silent epidemic' in Mexico, with many deaths receiving little or no media coverage.

Under Transgender Europe, or TGEU, the Trans Murder Monitoring project reported 281 trans and gender-diverse people murdered in 2025 alone, with 90% of those killed being trans women. Notably, sex workers comprised 34% of these deaths, with most of the overall deaths occurring in Latin America.

The Human Rights Watch, in their report on violence against LGBT people in El Salvador, Guatemala, and Honduras, note that Central American governments have long excluded transgender women from preexisting legal structures meant to prosecute femicides. Guatemalan officials have justified this by stating that transgender women are not "biological women" in their eyes and therefore their murders are not covered by such laws.

In the case of Vicky Hernández v Honduras, tried before Inter-American Court of Human Rights (IACHR), the Robert F. Kennedy Human Rights organization and Red Lésbica Cattrachas successfully argued that the government of Honduras held responsibility for the death of trans activist and sex worker Vicky Hernández. The result of the case was seen as a landmark ruling establishing a powerful precedent for the defense of transgender women and LGBT Latin Americans broadly.

=== Tendency in serial killings ===
Serial femicide is defined as "the sexually sadistic killing of women", also called "sexual terrorism". Over 90% of serial killers are male.

Male serial murderers tend to use more brutal methods of killing, such as suffocation and beatings. In contrast, women use poison or less violent measures. In addition, while a large percentage of male serial killers focus on women as their targets, female serial killers are less likely to focus exclusively on males. Some male serial killers focus on males as targets, such as Jeffrey Dahmer and Wayne Williams. The ways serial murderers are portrayed in the media reflect the views on femicide and gender in society. Often, murders of prostitutes, low-income women, and women of color by serial killers receive less attention in the media than the killings of younger, prettier, more affluent women, usually married, engaged, or in relationships with much handsome, affluent, younger men their age.

According to the FBI's Supplementary Homicide Report, local police reported that about 33,000 homicides of women remain unsolved.

Feminists such as Diana Russell and Jane Caputi believe in a link between the rise of serial murders and the advent of pornography. Specifically, the advent of films that eroticize violence and murder of women has been correlated to the desires of serial killers. Numerous serial murderers filmed their victims as they violently killed them. However, the link between pornography and serial murders is not proven.

=== Female infanticide and geronticide ===
Female infanticide is the killing of female infants. It is found all over the world regardless of a country's sophistication. A common misconception is that it is only related to abortions, but it also includes "girl-child murders". Female infanticide plays an important role in the imbalance of gender populations. In countries where female infanticide is practiced, the male populations is higher than the female population.

Similarly, female geronticide refers to the killing of elderly females, and "this may be because they are elderly or because they are women, or for both reasons." One challenge of characterizing female geronticide is defining age; in other words, who can be considered an elder. This changes according to culture which itself is a critical factor within research.

== Worldwide ==
Every year around the world, one woman or girl is killed on behalf of her gender by an intimate partner or someone in her family approximately every 10 minutes, equivalent to 6 women per hour with over 50,000 of such cases annually and nearly 140 daily. In 2022, the number of women and girls murdered globally was nearly 89,000. According to a 2000 report by the U.N. Population Fund (UNFPA), approximately 5,000 women are murdered each year in honor killings, with one intentional murder every 1 hour and 45 minutes and a girl dies to female genital mutilation yearly every 12 minutes. The rates of femicide differ depending on the specific country, but of the countries with the top 25 highest femicide rates, 50% are in Latin America, with number one being El Salvador. Also included in the top 25 are seven European countries, three Asian countries, and one African country, South Africa. Social beliefs and acceptability about gender based violence varies from country to country.

Data on femicide worldwide is poor, and often countries do not report gender differences in murder statistics. Many communities do not have access to resources or accurate data. In addition, reporting data on migrants is particularly scarce. High-income countries have seen more decreases in femicide than low-income countries.

=== Africa ===
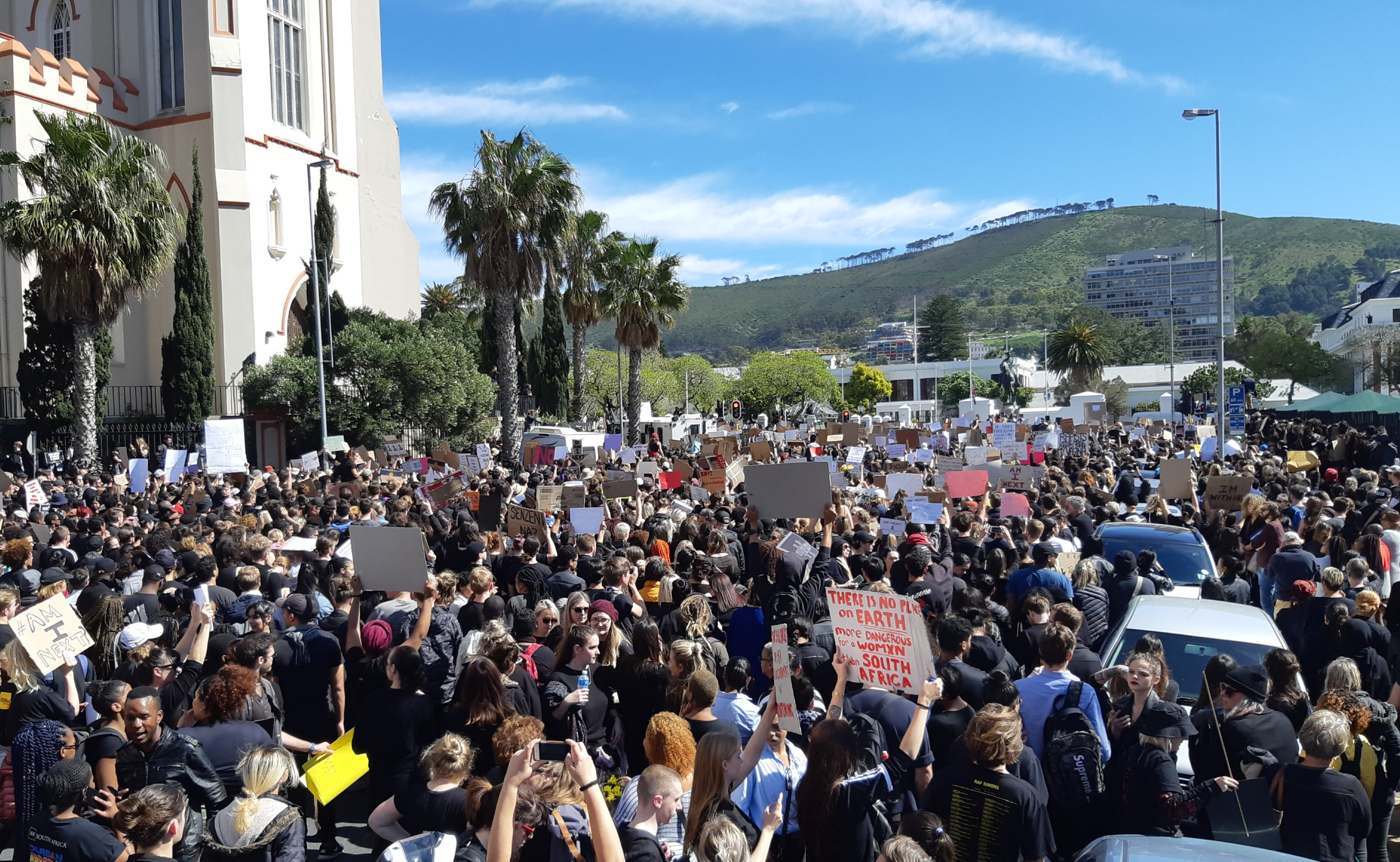
Demonstration against femicide in Cape Town, South Africa following the murder of Uyinene Mrwetyana, 2019

The continent varies in the manifestations of femicide depending on the country or region.

In 2023, Africa recorded 21,000 cases which led to the highest rates and absolute numbers of intimate partner and family-related femicide, the rate is followed by the Americas, and then by Oceania. Asia recorded the second highest absolute numbers.

Between 1990 and 2021, the number of female homicides in Africa rose from 12,570 to 19,769, though the age-standardized death rate decreased from 4.58 to 3.34 per 100,000 women, remaining nearly double the global average of 1.76 per 100,000 in 2021.

==== Burundi ====
As of 2023, it has been noted there is a growing problem of femicide.

==== Kenya ====
Although Kenya has had an increase in femicide reports, there is a lack of proper data management systems. There is a lack of media representation in many counties, underreported murder cases and omission of details under the murder circumstances. As a result, Nairobi, Nakuru and Kiambu have been reported as the leading counties with femicide victims.

Africa Data Hub analyzed 930 female murders between 2016 and 2017 in Kenya, with 628 of them meeting the United Nations Office on Drugs and Crime (UNODC)'s definition of femicide, with the highest femicide specific cases occurring in 2024, totaling to 127 from 82 in 2023. According to the Inspector General (DIG) of Police Eliud Lagat, law enforcement recorded 97 cases between September and November 2024, which translated to approximately one woman killed everyday. Femicide Count reported that there were 160 cases of femicide in 2024 with the highest month being January.

Intimate partners and family members have been found to be the biggest perpetrators. An analysis from Africa Data Hub showed that 77% of reported cases were from people that the victims knew; friend, relative, intimate partner. Husbands then boyfriends have been found to be the biggest perpetrators. Approximately 72% of cases take place within the confines of their home.

Once a perpetrator is arrested and brought to court, it takes an average of 1900 days for a case to be concluded and the suspect sentenced, not encompassing appeals that might lengthen the process even further.

On 10 December 2024, thousands of people, mostly women, marched in the capital city, Nairobi, in protest against a wave of femicides. Some smaller groups also marched in other towns. The main demand was for the government to take action. Despite the protest being peaceful, the police used tear gas to disperse the group in Nairobi. At least 3 activist protesters were detained.

In the year 2025, at least 220 femicide cases were documented with 129 cases occurring in the first three months, indicating an average of one woman killed every day. After March 2025, the Government stopped publicly releasing consolidated data on femicide thus creating a gap in accountability and transparency.

==== South Africa ====
South Africa has one of the world's highest femicide rates. The United Nations Office on Drugs and Crime (UNODC) recorded the global female homicide rate at roughly 2.2 per 100,000 in 2021. In 2022, South Africa's femicide rate was 12.2 per 100,000 – about six times higher. According to UN Women, South Africa has five times higher than the global average of femicide rates. Women for Change (WFC), an NGO dedicated to combating gender-based violence (GBV) and femicide (GBVF), noted that 5,578 women were killed between April 2023 and March 2024, with femicide rising 33.8% year on year. "The sad reality within South Africa when it comes to GBVF is that we have a conviction rate of 12%," WFC's national spokesperson, Cameron Kasambala said, claiming that at least 86% of the time nothing was done when victims of GBVF reported cases to the police. In 2019, President Cyril Ramaphosa described South Africa as one of "the most unsafe places in world to be a woman". GBVF had been declared a national crisis in 2019. In November 2025 during the G20 Summit, The National Disaster Management Centre (NDMC) upgraded GBVF to a national disaster.

=== Asia ===
==== China ====
In present-day China, despite official condemnation and outrage, female infanticide continues. In late 1982, the Chinese press was the first to indicate that female infanticide was being practiced as the final option to circumvent the one-child policy. An expert from the City University of New York, however, disagrees with the tendency to characterize female infanticide as "the unfortunate consequence of Chinese population control and modernization policies". She defines female infanticide as "part of a crime of gender", which she refers to as "social femicide", and relates it to the broader problem of gender inequality in Chinese society.

Female infanticide was common in traditional China, where natural hardships such as famines reinforced cultural norms favoring sons, and encouraged hard-pressed families to abandon or kill their infant daughters. Furthermore, daughters became liabilities, as gender was also crucial to the system of ancestor worship, in which only sons were allowed to carry out ritual sacrifices. Thus, "if a couple failed to produce a son, its crucial links to the past and future were broken".

==== India ====
Rita Banerji, feminist author and founder of The 50 Million Missing Campaign to end female gendercide in India, has said that there are also millions of girls and women killed through various forms of femicides that extend across various age groups. In a U.N. Symposium on Femicide in Vienna on 26 November 2012, she talked about the six most widespread forms of femicide in India. These included female infanticide, the killing of girls under six years through starvation and violence, the killing of women due to forced abortions, so-called honor killings, dowry murders, and Witch-hunts.

In colonial India, certain forms of girl femicide were associated with ancient Hinduism. The most infamous was sati, the Hindu practice of self immolation after the death of a husband. Coerced sati was tantamount to femicide, according to modern definitions, but it is important to point out that in practice most satis were child widows, and de facto they were girl femicides.

Many of the femicides in India are perpetrated against girls. Despite progressive legal reforms in many parts of the country, strong patriarchal values are maintained, and help perpetuate the subordination of women. According to the Special Rapporteur on violence against women for the Human Rights Council, key factors behind gender-motivated killings of women in Asia are the high level of importance placed on women's chastity and their subordination in the greater society. For example, while the Penal Code of India now specifically prohibits dowry, the reported number of dowry-related deaths of women has almost doubled from 4,836 to 8,383 over the past twenty years (1990–2009). The code is also criticized for having a low impact on the criminalization of perpetrators, noted in the low conviction rate of ten percent.

The country has attempted to manage femicide through some policy enactment. India has primarily focused on creating legislation related to population control, resulting in pressures to have a son. Some regions in India have incentivized parents to birth daughters by offering money to families with girls, in order to offset the expenses associated with having a daughter. However, there have been research studies analysing femicide policy, specifically in relation to India, that have found "the criminalization of sex selection has not been successful".

==== Iran ====
During 2021–2024, around 180 women reportedly were murdered by their husbands mostly honor killings. The bill against violence on women was passed in 2023 after a decade in government.

==== Nepal ====
Suicide is the leading cause of death for Nepalese women in the reproductive age group, with causes ranging from domestic abuse, forced marriage, casting out of widows, and lack of property rights. In this context, there is minimal acceptance and respect of young girls and women, and often an absence of family support. This results in a variety of context-specific versions of femicide and gender-based violence in the region: honor killings, acid attacks, witch-hunting, foeticide, and gender-based violence during caste and communal conflict.

==== South Korea ====
In South Korea, violence towards women has been increasing. In 2012, a man named Oh Won-choon killed a woman while attempting to sexually assault her while going home. In 2014, while waiting for a bus, a woman was stabbed to death by a drunk man. Then in 2016, a 34-year-old whose surname is Kim randomly murdered a woman in her twenties in a Gangnam Station bathroom. Regarding motives, Kim clearly stated that he murdered her out of hatred for women saying: "women have always ignored me."

The rise in violence towards women has made women fearful. In 2019, The South Korean government released the 2019 Domestic Violence Survey Study that found that only 27.6 percent of women over the age of 13 feel society is safe for them. The study also found that women accounted for 98 percent of victims in intimate partner femicide (domestic violence) cases. In 2019 32,000 sex crimes against women were reported; that is 12,000 more cases than in 2010. All the while domestic violence cases have reached 50,000 in 2019 compared to 6,800 cases in 2011.

While these numbers may not be completely accurate; it is estimated that there are more femicide, and intimate partner femicide cases not being reported due to Confucianist influences on South Korean society. Confucianism believes women should be subordinate to men and assumes women's status as inferior from men. These values also hold that women have only three roles: Daughter, wife, and mother and that women must obey the head of the family, that is to say her father before marriage and her husband after marriage. South Korea's traditional patriarchal culture and values assign strict roles to female members, as well as their strong belief that a woman's place should be with her family no matter what, cause women to be wary of reporting violence towards them due to fear of bringing shame to the family or affecting the family' social status.

In a study focusing on the experiences of 14 female victims of intimate partner femicide in getting help with domestic violence found that victims didn't talk to their family or sought them out for support. Only one participant escaped their abusive relationship because their parents saw the bruises and called the police. Victims were scared to talk to their families. They were scared that their parents would get angry and be saddened by seeing their daughters get abused. Additionally, it is also taboo for women to talk about their romantic relationships with their parents.

In the study, four victims chose the police as a support to escape their abuser. They decided to call the police when the relationship became a risk for their health. Two out of the four victims shared their negative experiences with the police. The police refused to get involved because they thought that what they were experiencing were normal relationship conflicts. These victims saw that current laws in South Korea are inadequate for protecting them from domestic femicide victims. They were deeply frustrated about it and they felt anxious and scared since they felt no one could protect them.

The legal system does not favor women suffering from femicide and intimate partner femicide. Victims find it hard to report an aggressive male behavior, domestic partner violence, and violence towards women due to the idea that sexual assault and domestic violence is a matter that should be handled "privately". In South Korea two legislations that protected women were enacted for the first time in 1997. "Special Action Punishment of Domestic Violence Crimes" legislation was established to punish the perpetrators. This law states if someone is found to be guilty of psychological, mental and physical violence the perpetrator will be fined or face jail time. The "Act on Prevention of Domestic Violence and Protection of Victims" legislation is used to protect the victims by reporting systems, provision of protection facilities and support services for victims. Even though this law protects victims it is limited since it only protects married couples and does not address couples who are not married and face intimate partner violence.

Olivia Shieber, a senior program manager of foreign and defense policy studies, describes Korean courts as lenient with sex crime punishments. In 2013, the Korean Supreme court upheld the country's first spousal rape conviction which is something in which South Korea was lagging behind when compared to other first world countries. It wasn't until the year 2020 when the age of consent was raised from 13 to 16, with a stipulation that the perpetrator must be 19 or older to be prosecuted for sex crimes against victims between the age of 13 and 16. Additionally, the fact that just 30% of judges and less than 4% of police personnel are women clearly affects how crimes of this sort are handled by the Korean judicial system. Even in cases where prosecutors successfully prosecute a defendant for a sex offense, the offenders are usually given a suspended sentence. Additionally, due to the country's strict legal definitions, it is still challenging to prove rape and other sex crimes in South Korea and some defendants have even exploited South Korea's tough defamation laws to sue their alleged victims for defamation making victims scared to come forward. Ultimately, women that face intimate partner violence or femicide in Korea are left feeling isolated and disenfranchised, neglected by the legal system and socially outcast while having to increasingly worry about femicide rates rising.

==== Turkey ====
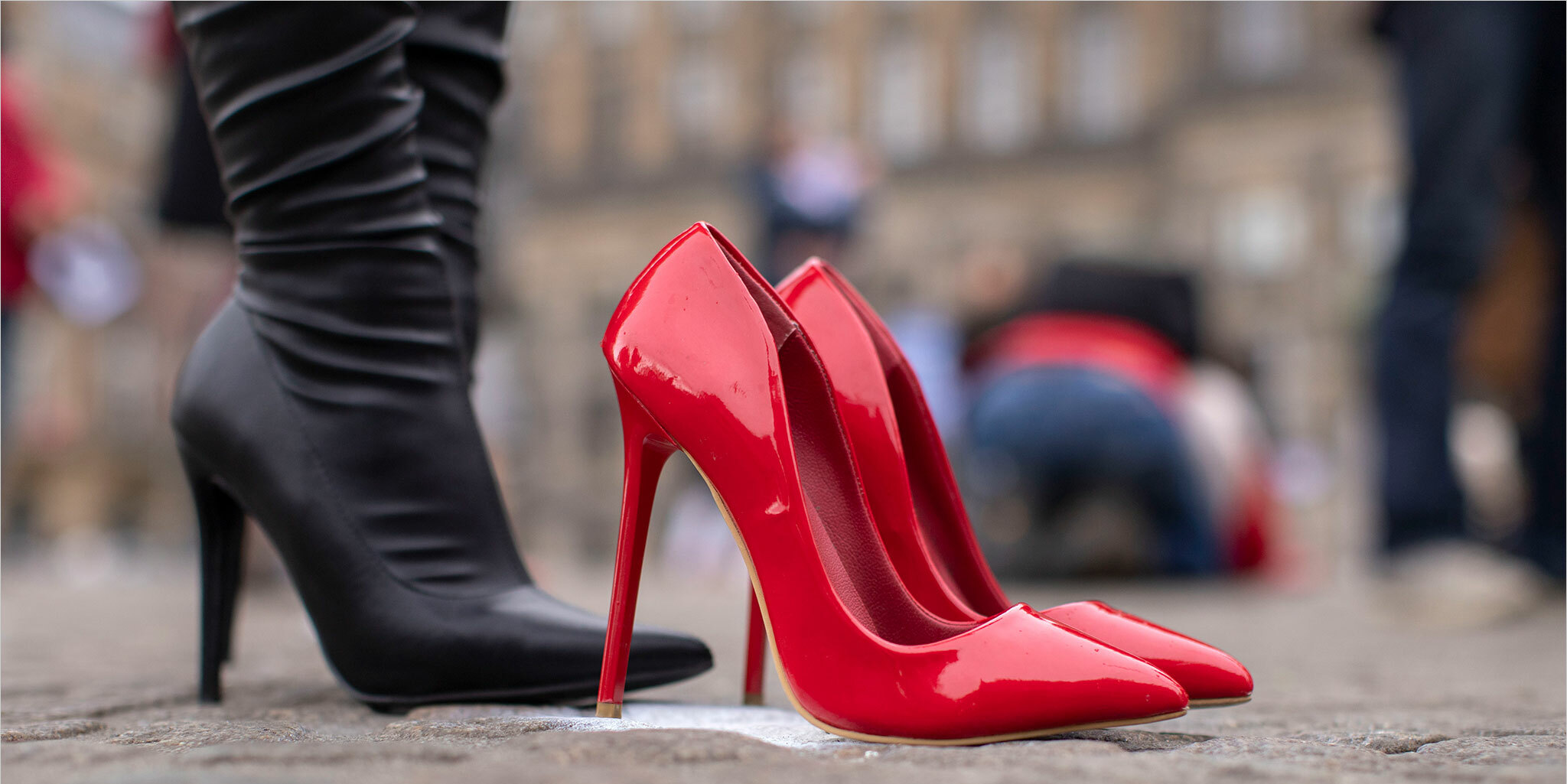
Red shoes as a symbolic protest for femicide

A gender-based discriminatory notion of honor is sometimes the cause of serious cases of health deterioration or mutilation among women in Turkey. According to the Report on Custom and Honor Killings by the country's General Directorate of Security, 1,028 custom and honor killings were committed between the years of 2003 and 2007. However, according to the World Data Bank, femicide rates in Turkey were 0.9 women murdered due to violence against women per 100k women. Which ranks it about the same femicide rate as Istanbul-convention ratifiers such as Germany & Austria, but still significantly higher than most of the other ratifiers. Since 2019, Turkeys femicide rate have seen a significant drop of 44.9%.

According to the data of the General Directorate of Security covering killings in Turkey until 2007, honor killings happen predominantly in the Southeastern part of the country. The rates of murderers born in Eastern and Southeastern Anatolia are much higher than murderers born in other regions. With 24% of the murderers born in Southeastern Anatolia and 21% in Eastern Anatolia, they share the top spot. While in comparison, only 8% of the murderers are born in the Marmara region. Even though that region has the highest rate of honor killings, which means that the killings are primarily committed by people born outside that region. The reason behind this is the fact that honor killings are still receiving support in Eastern and Southeastern Anatolia. According to a survey in Diyarbakir, a city in Southeastern Anatolia, 40% of the respondents supported honor killing. In some court cases this has led the court to decide to send the entire family to prison. For example, in 2009, an entire Kurdish family was sent to prison for life, because they were involved in the honor killing of their daughter, who got pregnant after being raped.

In 2020, 300 women died as a result of femicide in Turkey, which is 174 (36%) less than the year before The source started differentiating between confirmed femicides and suspicious deaths in 2020, so the more representative numbers to compare are: 474 in 2019 and 471 in 2020, a decrease of about 0,5%. According to the same source, suspicious deaths have been rising for the past years. Totaling the numbers from confirmed and suspicious deaths in 2021 497 have been killed, in 2020 471 have been killed and in 2019 474 have been killed.

In March 2021, via presidential decree, the Turkish government made the decision to leave the Istanbul convention, making it the first and only country in the Council of Europe to have withdrawn from any international human rights convention. This has sparked outrage in the population, as according to polls, only 26% of the population voted in favor of leaving. In the past the president has stated, that the women's rights movement is diverting women from their original roles as mothers and wives, while also normalizing tolerance to homosexuality. National women's rights organizations, who had been criticizing lack of implementation of the convention for years, now have concerns about rising femicide rates in Turkey.

Seven women were killed by current or former partners in one day in 2024.

=== Australia ===
In 2019, a recent statistic from the Australian Institute of Criminology indicated that on average, one woman a week is murdered in an act of femicide in Australia.

=== Europe ===
Victims of femicide per 100.000 women (2017) Femicide by family and relatives Femicide by intimate partners

In Europe, agencies have funded initiatives on gender and violence but not specifically on femicide. Research is in its infancy and uncoordinated. A COST Action IS1206 has established the first pan-European coalition on femicide with researchers who are already studying the phenomenon nationally to advance research clarity, agree on definitions, improve the efficacy of policies for femicide prevention, and publish guidelines for the use of national policy-makers. EU reports show that additional support has been needed during the period of pandemic lockdown in many countries

Available data are limited: Eurostat covers only 20 countries and there are discrepancies in the way in which the data is collected. According to available data in Western Europe, the average annual rate is 0.4 victims of femicide for every 100,000 women. The worst situations are found in Montenegro, Lithuania, and Latvia. In most countries, the partner is the most common perpetrator. However, there are exceptions: in Lithuania and Bosnia and Herzegovina, most femicides are committed by family members. Also, while male victims of homicide have been in a sharp decline in recent years, the number of women murdered in Europe, not necessarily at the hands of a partner or family member, remains constant, with a slight increase from 2013 to 2015. From 2013 to 2017, 30 European countries joined a COST (Cooperation on Science and Technology) project called "femicide across Europe.

The European Union first enacted COST (Cooperation on Science and Technology), a program known as COST Action. COST Action led to four different femicide research groups: definitions, data collection, cultural issues, and advocacy and prevention. Thirty countries signed a Memorandum of Understanding with COST that promoted international efforts to address femicide and the Action program. The Istanbul Convention was a gathering of multiple independent states who had a common goal of acknowledging and addressing femicide. However, the convention "is not a treaty, and not legally binding for all states", and thus is not an official policy.

==== France ====
Depending on the sources, between 122 and 149 women were murdered in France in 2019 by their partners or ex-partners.

==== Germany ====
Germany has one of the highest absolute femicide numbers in Europe.

==== Italy ====
Statistics of femicide in Italy are reported by year (1995–2019) by the independent Women NGO.

On 25 November 2025, the Italian parliament passed a bill explicitly classifying femicide as a distinct crime. It was introduced into the country's criminal code with the penalty of life imprisonment.

==== Ireland ====
Statistics of Femicide in Ireland are reported by the Women's Aid NGO.

==== Spain ====
Statistics and structure of femicide in Spain are reported by year (2010–2019).

==== Switzerland ====
The research project Stop Femicide reports that in Switzerland, one woman is killed every two weeks by a man she knows – typically a husband, partner, ex-partner, or male relative. At least one more woman each week survives an attempted femicide.

There is no official government body that systematically records femicides or maintains its own statistics on gender-based killings. This lack of data is criticized by researchers, politicians, and civil society groups, as it makes it more difficult to analyze, prevent, and strategically combat violence against women.

==== United Kingdom ====
Interest in reporting and analyzing levels of femicide in the United Kingdom has grown in recent years, and several national organizations provide support In 2021, a campaign began in the UK led by The Observer and the Femicide Census to better identify femicide, to improve the knowledge of it, and to encourage improved methods to end it. This included raising awareness of the data produced by the Femicide Census The organisation, led by Karen Ingala Smith and Clarrie O'Callaghan, justifies it as bringing data together in this way "significantly improves upon currently available data by providing detailed comparable data about femicides in the UK since 2009, including demographic and social factors and the methods men selected to kill women. By collating femicides, we can see that these killings are not isolated incidents, and many follow repeated patterns." By taking an intersectional approach to the data campaigners, academics and journalists are able to highlight patterns of concern, such as the numbers of older women being killed, those killed by partners and ex-lovers, or those killed during lockdown. On average, in the UK, a woman is killed by a man every three days, or by a current or former partner, every four days. The data is not gathered in Scotland. Data published in 2022 shows that in year ending March 2021, 177 women were murdered in England and Wales (for comparison, 416 men were killed in this period). Where there was a known suspect, 92% of the women were killed by men.

In 2023, Labour MP for domestic abuse, Jess Phillips, received significant criticism from gender critical activists for naming the trans-girl, Brianna Ghey as a victim of femicide, stating that this inclusion was "an insult to the memory of the women and children tragically killed this year".

In 2024, there were growing concerns of black femicides within the UK as black women and girls in recent statistics were more likely than those of other races to be killed by their partners, family members or non-intimate people in Greater London; they faced not only higher rates but also formed the majority of victims. 2022 data from the Metropolitan Police showed that Black women made up 43% of femicide victims despite just 14% of the London population being Black. This was a significant increase from 2021, when just 12% of femicide victims were Black. The figures of black femicide rose to 62% in 2023. Southall Black Sisters and the Femicide Census had been critical of the Metropolitan Police and mayor, Sadiq Khan, for undermining such killings targeting exclusively black women.

In 2025, recent studies from the Femicide Census indicated that there had been more mothers killed by their sons than women by strangers. These types of femicides are hidden and the census said that there is still insufficient help available for women and girls facing violence from their families, including mothers by their sons. Out of 121 women killed by men in 2022, 12% were by sons whilst 11% were by someone unknown.

==== Lithuania ====
Lithuania is among the few countries in Europe in which family-related femicides (such as fathers, mothers, brothers, or uncles) outnumber intimate partners.

=== Latin America ===
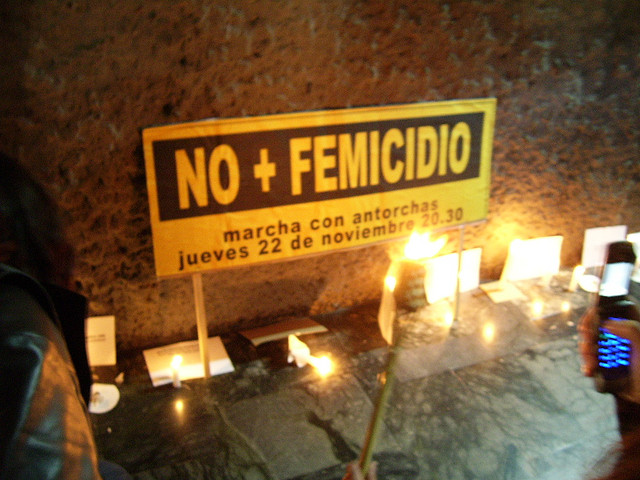
A candle memorial to women killed by femicide (femicidio), Chile, 2007.

Feminists in Latin America have been among the first to adopt the term femicide, referring to the female homicides in Ciudad Juárez, Mexico. This term inspired feminists in Latin America to organize anti-feminicide groups to challenge this social injustice towards women. The use of the term femicide, and the creation of anti-femicide feminist organizations, spread from Mexico, to many other Latin American countries, like Guatemala. In Latin America, femicide is an issue that occurs in many countries, but most predominantly in Central America, in countries such as El Salvador and Honduras, and other places, such as Brazil and Mexico. The Latin American region includes 5 of the 12 countries with the highest rate of femicide in the world. According to Julia Estela Monárrez-Fragoso of the Colegio de la Frontera Norte based in Ciudad Juárez, victims are often blamed for being out late at night, or for hanging around "questionable" areas, such as discotecas or nightclubs. Between 2000 and 2010, more than five thousand Guatemalan women and girls were murdered. Guatemala's historical record reveals a long history of acceptance of gendered violence, and the military, government, and judiciary's role in normalizing misogyny. In a Report on the Violations of Women's Rights in Guatemala by a United Nations Human Rights Committee, the state's failure to enforce laws protecting women from femicide is seen as highly problematic. The report argues that enforcing laws against the murder of women is a low priority of state governments, due to patriarchal beliefs, and assumptions about the role of women in society.

Various activists and scholars, such as Monárrez, have argued that connections exist between the femicides and neoliberal policies, namely North American Free Trade Agreement (NAFTA). They believe that the treaty has served to open trade borders, and to increase foreign investment targeted at manufacturing low-cost garments in maquiladoras.

Intimate partner femicide is the most common form of femicide, and high violence and crime rates in these countries also contribute to this issue. There is a lack of an organized system to record information and statistical data to support this issue. Machismo, a history of civil wars, and other cultural influences can also contribute to this issue, specifically in Latin America. Torture, mutilation, defacement, sexual assault, and the dumping of bodies is a common trend with femicide.

It has been observed that many of the women killed in Ciudad Juárez are young mothers who migrate to this region seeking employment in maquiladoras. They then become easy targets, due to the fact that they are separated from their family, and are typically alone when traveling home. Policy solutions in Central America have tried making transportation safer (see below for policy solutions). Other scholars, such as Itallurde, point to the culpability of corporations "based on the concepts and doctrines of tortuous negligence, failure to protect, and aiding and abetting". Other scholars, such as historians Steven Volk and Marian Schlotterbeck, hypothesize that there may be a "macho backlash" behind these killings: "Certainly male egos, of fathers and would-be boyfriends, must suffer some deflation from this dramatic change in the economic influence of these young women."

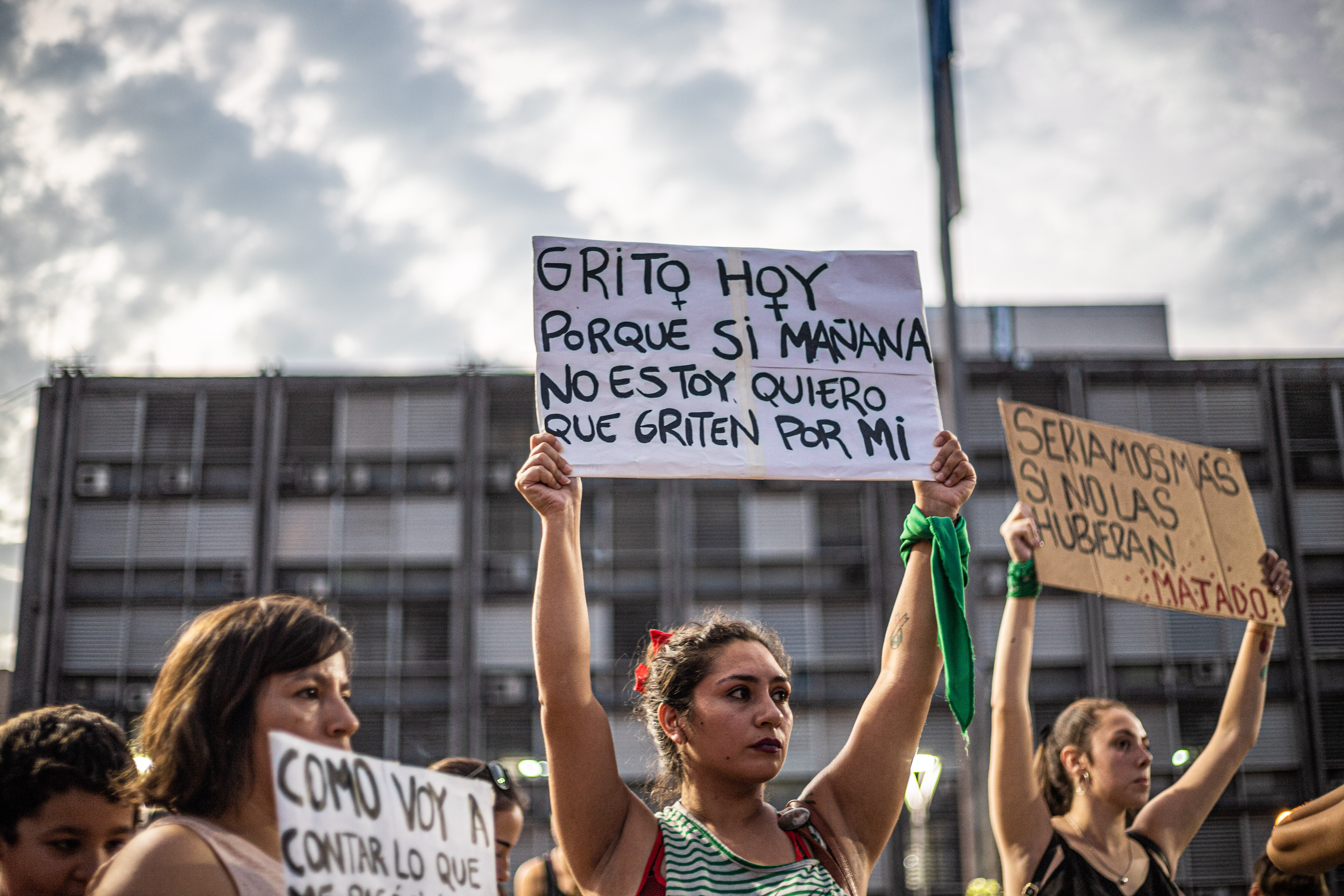
Protest against femicide in Argentina, 2020

In 2015, Mexican Supreme Court required the police to reopen and investigate a murder case from a femicide "perspective". The case of Mariana Lima Buenida, was reopened almost thirteen years later. She was found dead in her home on 28 June 2010, at the time her husband, a police officer, insisted she committed suicide. Irinea Buendia, Mariana's mother, fought and advocated for her daughter's case. The reopening of the case would lead to justice after more than a decade, a monumental moment in Mexico's judicial history that acknowledges the first case of femicide within the Mexican Supreme Court.

However, there have been some actions taken to address this issue. The criminalization of femicide and various laws passed in specific countries have aimed to stop this problem. In addition, the United Nations has taken a role in stopping this with a commission that calls for action to be taken. There is a growing social awareness around this issue with #NiUnaMenos (Not One Woman Less) or #NiUnaMas (Not One More Woman). Lastly, female friendly urban zones have been created as a concrete solution. These zones include female-only transportation, and government centers offering services specifically for women.

Central American policymakers have experimented with creating "female-friendly urban zones". "Pink" public transportation networks have been established in Mexico, Brazil, El Salvador, and Guatemala to provide women-only forms of public transportation to stem sexual harassment, and to provide safety for women. These efforts have received substantial praise and criticism.

Criticism from feminists and others often point to the efficacy of gender segregation in changing gender norms of oppression - specifically the Latin American cultural conventions of "machismo" and "marianismo", which are potent social regulators throughout the region.

Feminist philosopher and gender studies scholar Judith Butler spoke on feminicido in an interview for their 2024 book "Who's Afraid of Gender?". They note how some feminist movements in Latin America lie in opposition to feminicide, particularly in their failure to acknowledge how this same violence impacts groups beyond cis-women; including trans women, gender non-conforming, and the queer community. Butler firmly poses this as a "brutal failure of coalitional politics", and emphasizes the need to look at freedom in terms of not only individual liberty, but as a collective.

==== Brazil ====
Through the Law No. 13,104 in 2015, the femicide is a crime provided for in the Brazilian Penal Code, item VI, paragraph 2, of art. 121, when committed "against a woman on grounds of female condition". The Paragraph 2-A, of art. 121, complements the section, by stating that there are reasons of female condition when the crime involves domestic and family violence or contempt or discrimination against women. The penalty for this crime is 12 to 30 years in prison.

On the other hand, despite the increased rigor of criminal law, in a survey carried out by the newspaper Folha de S. Paulo, in 2019, there were 1,310 murders resulting from domestic violence or motivated by gender, characteristics of femicide. It was an increase of 7.2% compared to 2018. In 2023, during the first half of the year, the country had already recorded 722 cases of femicide, 2.6% more than crimes of the same nature recorded in the same period of 2022, according to data from the Brazilian Public Security Forum (FBSP).

==== Colombia ====
Colombia has followed 16 other Latin American countries by passing a law defining and punishing femicide for being a specific crime. On 6 July 2015, the government of Colombia passed a law that legally defines femicide as a crime with 20 to 50 years of jail time. This new law is named after Rosa Elvira Cely, a Colombian woman who was raped and murdered in 2012. Cely's death sparked national outrage, and caused thousands to march down the streets of Bogotá. Her murderer was found guilty, and was sentenced to 48 years in prison. The challenge now becomes implementing the law. Miguel Emilio La Rota, head of public policy and planning at Colombia's attorney general's office, said that the prosecutor's office must change how it investigates femicide. Colombia prosecuted a transgender woman's murder as a femicide for the first time in 2018, sentencing Davinson Stiven Erazo Sánchez to twenty years in a psychiatric center for "aggravated femicide" a year after he killed Anyela Ramos Claros, a transgender woman.

==== El Salvador ====
In El Salvador, an endeavor has been made to create multiple government centers that house many gender-specific services in one place, to cut down on commute time, and to increase the physical safety of women as they seek services such as counseling, child care, and reproductive health. "The first center hopes to provide access to an estimated 162,000 women from the neighboring departments of La Libertad and Sonsonate. Supported by former Chilean president and head of UN Women Michelle Bachelet, the initiative cost $3.2 million, with an additional $20 million loan from the Inter-American Development Bank earmarked for the construction of new sites."

Critics of this action point to the contradictory abortion laws in El Salvador that are some of the harshest in the world: abortion is completely illegal, even to save the life of the mother, or to help a survivor of incest or rape. "Coupled with the judicial system's weaknesses, violence is abetted by the same government that aims to protect and defend. High levels of impunity leave many crimes unresolved or unreported." Following legal reforms in the country, 2026 saw the first life sentenced handed out by the country's court over femicide.

==== Guatemala ====
Guatemala has championed the use of femicide as a concept by incorporating the term in its constitution: Decree 22. Lawmakers in this country passed Decree 22 in 2008 that defined Laws Against Femicide and Other Forms of Violence Against Women. These laws include 28 articles about prosecutable types of violence against women. They also created the Office of the Presidential Commission Against Femicide, enforcing the concept in the government and an anti-femicide unit of the National Police. Some results of the laws have proved encouraging, allowing many women to now report violence perpetrated against them. In the first month of 2010, a total of 27,000 women reported violence against them to the state, a large increase in the number of reported crimes. The laws also have helped several people jail their assailants, and have increased the severity of punishments for perpetrators. However, the actual enforcement of the new laws has been varied. Few offenders are ever actually convicted for the specific crime of femicide, and there are only three public prosecution offices in the entire country able to deal with the issue of femicide. In fact, only 127 convictions in 2010 occurred for female violence even though 46,000 cases overall were registered. Also, from 2000 to 2008, 98 percent of all femicide cases have remained in impunity. Some feminists argue that the culture in Guatemala is to blame. They cite that many male judges and other male government officials are sympathetic to the view that men's actions are justified, because they remain within the private sphere of the home. Attorney Romeo Silverio Gonzalez argued for this viewpoint when he stated that the new laws of Decree 22 were unconstitutional. He said that the laws were in contradiction to the private affairs of marriage. Attorney General Claudia Paz countered his viewpoint, ultimately defending the laws by justifying their existence because they protect women's rights. Overall, the legislation of these new laws has helped Guatemala improve the awareness of femicide and reporting of the crime, but enforcement and justice for femicide still have not been achieved. Femicide as the socially tolerated murder of women in Guatemala relies on the presence of systematic impunity, historically rooted gender inequalities, and the pervasive normalization of violence as a social relation.

==== Mexico ====
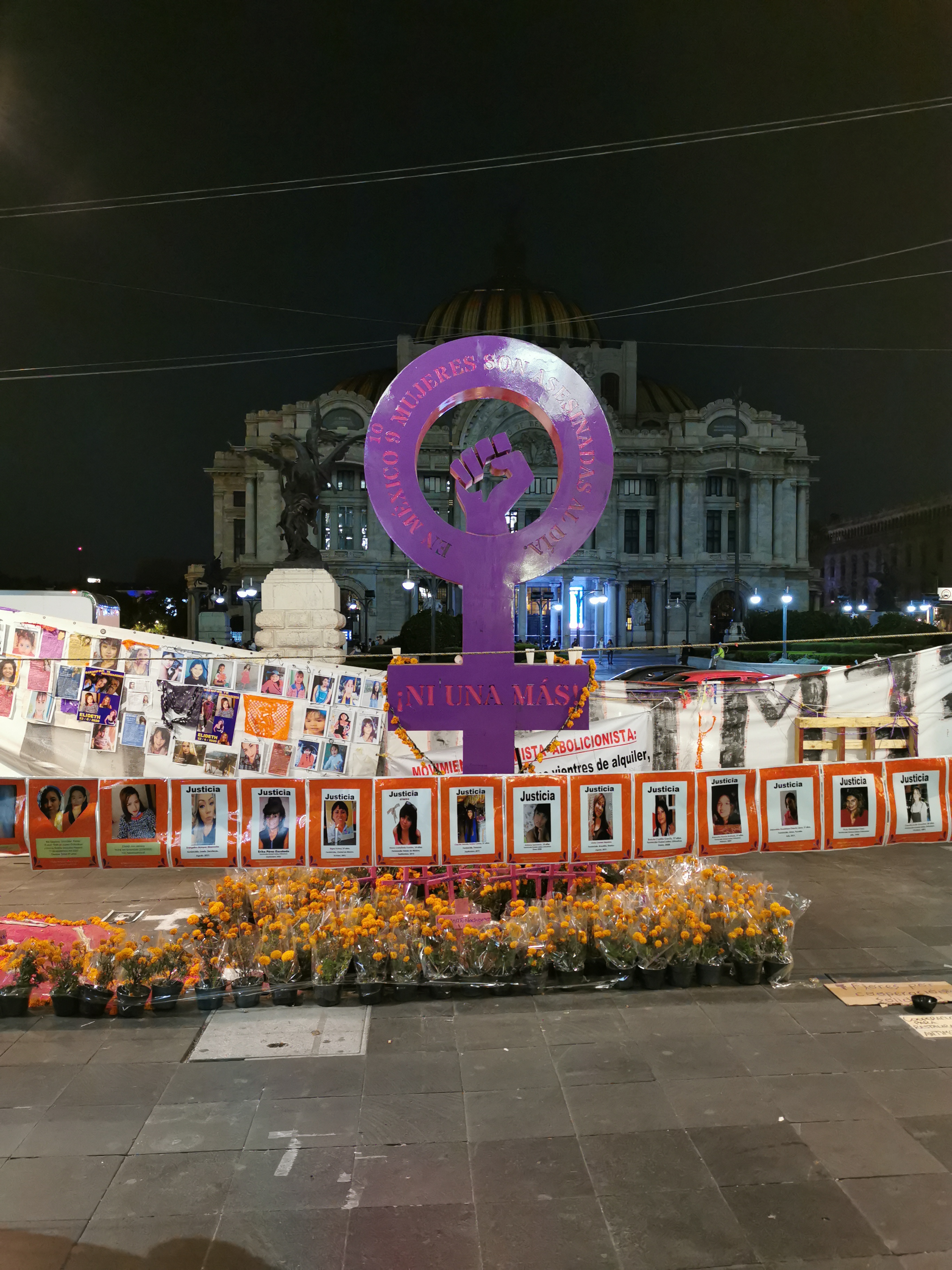
The Antimonumenta, an anti-monument against femicides in Mexico, in front of the Palacio de Bellas Artes in Mexico City

Amnesty International estimates that there have been around 34,000 female homicides in Mexico between 1986 and 2009. According to the National Citizen Observatory on Femicide, only 49 percent of the 800 cases of women killed in Mexico between June and July 2017 were investigated as femicide. In 2018, "93 percent of crimes were either not reported or not investigated." One activist, Natalia Reyes, reported that only 8 percent of femicides in Mexico are punished. Almost 35,000 people were murdered in 2019, Mexico's most violent year on record. Additionally, in 2012, Mexico was ranked as the 16th country in the world with the highest rates of femicides. In August 2021, a total of 108 femicides occurred in Mexico, the highest since 2019.

In 2016, Mexico had a rate of female homicides of 4.6 femicides per 100,000, and there were a total of 2,746 female deaths with the presumption of homicide, but that has more than doubled in the past 5 years. On average, about 10 women are killed everyday. In this year, the top three states with the highest rates of female deaths with the presumption of homicide were Colima (with 16.3 deaths per 100,000 women), Guerrero (13.1 per 100,000), and Zacatecas (9.7 per 100,000). The top three municipalities in 2016 were Acapulco de Juárez (24.22 per 100,000), Tijuana (10.84 per 100,000), and Juárez (10.36 per 100,000). During the years 2002–2010, the state of Chihuahua had the highest rate of female homicides in the world: 58.4 per 100,000. The rates of femicide in the municipality of Juárez have decreased significantly in just five years; in 2011, the rate of female deaths with the presumption of homicides was 31.49 per 100,000, and by 2016 it had decreased to 10.36 per 100,000.

There has been large demonstrations in Mexico against femicides; however, most took place after 11 February 2020. This was the day seven-year old Fatima Cecilia was kidnapped from school. She was found dead in a plastic bag a couple of days later. A movement called "Un Dia Sin Mujeres" (a day without women) spread all over the country right after Fatima's murder.

=== North America ===
==== United States ====
Femicide in the United States accounts for the deaths of more than five women daily, and 70% of the total deaths of women among high-income countries. One of the largest predictors of femicide in the United States is the appearance of physical abuse, which was found in 79% of all femicide cases in North Carolina. Gun availability in the United States has also had a substantial effect on femicide, correlating to 67.9% of deaths in a study by Karen D. Stout. Living in neighborhoods with increased poverty, ethnic heterogeneity, and decreased collective efficacy (social cohesion among neighbors) are all found to be linked to increased femicide rates in that area. Also, reporting of female victims of femicide in the US is stymied, due to the assumption that female victims are not an anomaly, but are driven by their perceived vulnerability and passivity.

==== Canada ====
Proper statistics of femicide in Canada can be difficult to come across, since possible acts of femicide are regularly labelled as the killing of a spouse. However, femicide is a widespread violent act that takes place in countries all over the world, and Canada is no exception. In 2019, there was a total of 678 homicides Canada-wide, of these cases 144 of the victims were female. Additionally, the rate at which female victims were killed by a spouse or intimate partner, was over eight times greater than the number of males killed by a spouse or intimate partner.

Historically speaking, less data exists regarding femicide in Canada; however, what is available shows a disproportionate amount of violence and femicide towards Indigenous women. Reports of the last few decades indicate over 600 murders of Indigenous women and girls in Canada. Unfortunately, in many cases, homicidal acts towards Indigenous females often aren't characterized as femicides, indicating that not all victims of femicide are treated in the same framework. Yet the research indicates that certain ethnic groups are at a greater risk for femicide compared to the rest of the population. To understand these statistics in Canada, an intersectional approach must be considered, to recognize the historical and ongoing effects of colonialism that disproportionately target Indigenous peoples within the country. Canada's continued negligence as a state to examine the effects of colonialism on Indigenous peoples has related to the high risk of femicide, and violence for Indigenous women and girls. Failure to acknowledge the deaths of Indigenous women ignores the decades of inequality and injustice that have, and continue to be, perpetuated by colonialism.

Colonialism produces a sense of dominant authoritative power that allows for the disregard of Indigenous individuals, and in this case, a disregard for the murders of Indigenous females. Indigenous women are reported to be five times more likely to experience violence and death compared with other groups in Canada. These murders are acts of racialized violence, in addition to the gendered violence of femicide. However, more often than not, these murders are regarded as a spousal homicide, rather than femicide, disregarding the violence and oppression Indigenous women face. In the mid-twentieth century, Indigenous women and girls were forced and coerced into undergoing sterilization procedures as an act of femicide, as well as genocide, at fourteen different Indian Hospitals across the state that were federally operated. Sterilization policies were implemented as a way to reduce the size and influence of Indigenous communities, resulting in there being about 1,200 cases of forced or coerced sterilization, that directly targeted the reproductive rights and properties of Indigenous women and girls. Exclusionary politics and legal discrimination throughout the history of Canada, means that the violence faced by Indigenous women and girls has gone unacknowledged, serving to further state-controlled colonial power over Indigenous peoples. The scattered reports of femicide in Canada indicate a lack of understanding of how various acts of gender, race, class, and sexuality all intersect to create the environment of violence Indigenous women are subjected to. While femicide in Canada affects all women, it disproportionately targets the lives of Indigenous women and girls due to historical and ongoing actions of colonialism within the state.

One prominent instance of femicide occurring in Canada is the 1989 École Polytechnique massacre, which was an antifeminist mass shooting, which killed fourteen women, and injured ten women and four men.

Another example of a femicide attack in Canada is the 2018 Toronto van attack, a vehicle-ramming attack which saw eleven casualties, and fifteen injured. The perpetrator is a self-described "incel", whose goal was to exact revenge on women, after self-perceived social rejection.

=== United Nations ===
In 2013, the United Nations General Assembly updated their policy by recognizing that "gender-related killing of women and girls was criminalized in some countries as 'femicide' or 'feminicide', and has been incorporated as such into national legislation in those countries." Currently, Dr. Dubravka Šimonović is the special rapporteur to the UN. She has been an advocate of anti-femicide policy implementation. She has presented the UN with reports such as "Modalities for the establishment of femicides/gender-related killings". Dr. Šimonović has also proposed a "femicide watch" program to monitor femicide practices across the globe. The goal of Simonovic's academic program is to analyze data on femicide cases, to identify risk factors and any issues in public policy.

== Impact of the COVID-19 pandemic ==
The COVID-19 pandemic led not only to heightened rates of domestic violence against and suicide by girls and young women, but also to increased rates of femicide. Around 50,000 women were being murdered every year. This was due to the stay-at-home measures that increased the levels of isolation for women and girls. This became a life-or-death situation if they were locked in with violent partners or relatives. "The increasing economic instability and unemployment rates worldwide" led to "heightened violence" for women. Additionally, there was an increase in calls to domestic violence hotlines in various countries after the lockdown began.

Most countries also "diverted" resources and efforts "from violence against women response to immediate COVID-19 relief".

UK policeman Wayne Couzens used the Covid restrictions to detain and arrest Sarah Everard. He then murdered her and a few days later he was arrested.

== Statistics ==
The following chart includes the femicide rate per 100,000 women and the countries it occurs, ordered from were lower rate to higher rate.

Country	Femicide rate per 100,000 women
Japan	0.2
China	0.2
Israel	0.3
Chile	0.4
Vietnam	0.4
North Macedonia	0.4
Bosnia and Herzegovina	0.4
South Korea	0.5
Egypt	0.6
Denmark	0.8
India	0.8
Canada	0.9
France	1.0
Cameroon	1.0
Australia	1.0
Iran	1.1
New Zealand	1.1
Nepal	1.2
Puerto Rico	2.7
Ukraine	2.5
United States	2.9
Russia	3.0
Botswana	3.1
Namibia	3.8
Afghanistan	4.0
Colombia	4.1
Dominican Republic	4.1
El Salvador	4.2
Philippines	4.3
Pakistan	4.3
Belize	5.5
Costa Rica	5.8
Guatemala	6.1
Mexico	6.2
Nicaragua	6.3
Honduras	6.5
Uruguay	6.7
Brazil	6.9
South Africa	9.0
Paraguay	19.0

== Prevention ==
Attempting to prevent femicide could include implementing laws that would specifically work to improve the safety of women and address the risk factors mentioned. For example, harsher punishments for those that murder a woman solely based on their gender.

Fatality reviews could aid in addressing what contributes to femicide. This practice helps identify risk factors and encourages prevention. In general, more research on femicide would contribute to the creation of potential solutions.

=== Raising awareness ===
Raising awareness amongst the public about how femicide differs from other murders and crimes could also help with prevention by encouraging support for change in policy.

Advocacy groups raise awareness, especially if there is an absence of governmental action. These groups include women's advocacy groups as well as nongovernmental or non-profit organizations

=== Training officials ===
All officials involved in a gender-based crime should be adequately trained in order to offer support. Service workers, police officers, and legal professionals are some of the groups that should receive extensive training on signs of violence in different social groups, including minorities and migrants. Training is the first step to creating policies to prevent femicide.

== Legal solutions ==
Legal solutions to femicide include making laws and policies to prevent violence against women, as well as to prevent domestic and family violence. It has been suggested by some that countries should consider improving the status of women in terms of gender equality and create laws that support it.

In Latin America there have been many new laws to label the murders of women as femicide or feminicide using the definition of a woman targeted by a man based on misogyny. At the same time, feminicide goes beyond this definition and implicates the state's complicity in maintaining violence against women. These changes have been made due to global human rights norms, like the 1994 Inter-American Convention on the Prevention and the Eradication of Violence against Women, which expresses that gender violence is the state's responsibility. Nevertheless, these international norms are not regulated. They do not implement how a state should exercise new laws and policies to enforce violence against women.

Some countries have passed laws regarding femicide or crimes labeled as feminicides. In Mexico and Nicaragua, female activists became involved in legal activism so these states would have increased responsibility for female violence. In Nicaragua, the codification of Femicide came about from the country's response to feminist demands during a small political opportunity under the rule of a strict regime. In Mexico, prosecuting feminicides became successful because of good campaigning by local feminists connected to national arenas and through the intervention of feminist federal legislators. A known Mexican female activist, Marcela Lagarde, saw the rise of women being murdered in Mexico and demanded that the state take responsibility for the murders. She brought in the concept of femicide (the murder of females), which quickly spread across Latin America, and as of 2017, femicide and feminicide became crimes in 18 countries.

== See also ==
- Androcide
- Antifeminism
- Child abuse
  - Child murder
- Coercive control
- Domestic Violence
- Fetal abduction
- Female Genital Mutilation
- Female infanticide
- Gendercide
- Genocidal rape
- Honor killing
- Human trafficking
- Incel
- Internalized misogyny
- Inquisition
- Magic and religion
- Matricide
- Sexism
- Sex slavery
- Sororicide
- Witchcraft
- Witch-hunt
  - Witch trials in the early modern period
  - Salem witch trials
  - Torture of witches
  - European witchcraft
  - Modern witch-hunts
- Feminism
- Gender and religion
- Gender apartheid
- Hypermasculinity
- Manosphere
- Male privilege
- Misogyny – hatred of, contempt for, or prejudice against women
  - Misogynist terrorism
- Missing women, a term which is used in reference to a statistical phenomenon which was first identified in Asia (as opposed to the disappearance of individuals)
  - Missing and murdered Indigenous women
- Murder of Sarah Everard
- Murder of Sabina Nessa
- Necrophillia
- Patriarchy
- Raptio
- Son preference
- Slut shaming
- Transfemicide
- Violence against women
  - Violence against prostitutes
- Wartime sexual violence
  - War rape
    - Comfort women
      - Genocidal rape
- Women and religion
