= D'Ignazio =

D'Ignazio is an Italian surname. Notable people with the surname include:

- Catherine D'Ignazio, American software developer and professor
- Fred D'Ignazio (born 1949), American writer
- Luigi D'Ignazio (born 1998), Italian football player
