= Black Feminist Thought =

1990 book by Patricia Hill Collins

Black Feminist Thought: Knowledge, Consciousness and the Politics of Empowerment
- Author: Patricia Hill Collins
- Language: English
- Subject: Black feminism; women's studies
- Publisher: Hyman
- Publication date: 1990
- Pages: 384
- ISBN: 978-0-04-445137-2

Black Feminist Thought: Knowledge, Consciousness and the Politics of Empowerment is a 1990 book by Patricia Hill Collins.

== Defining Black feminist thought ==
Black feminist thought is a field of knowledge that is focused on the perspectives and experiences of Black women. There are several arguments in support of this definition. First, Peter L. Berger and Thomas Luckmann in The Social Construction of Reality (1966) and Karl Manheim in Ideology and Utopia (1936) similarly argue that the definition implies that the overall content of the thought and the historical and factual circumstances of Black women are inseparable. Proposition is that other groups in the field act as merely transcribers, whereas Black women are the actual authors. Second, the definition assumes that Black women possess a unique standpoint on, or perspective of, their experiences and that there will be certain commonalities of perception shared by Black women as a group. Third, while living life as Black women may produce certain commonalities of outlook, the diversity of class, region, age, and sexual orientation shaping individual Black women's lives has resulted in different expressions of these common themes. Thus, universal themes included in the Black women's standpoint may be experienced and expressed differently by distinct groups of Afro-American women. Finally, the definition assumes that, while a Black women's standpoint exists, its contours may not be clear to Black women themselves. Therefore, one role for Black female intellectuals is to produce facts and theories about the Black female experience that will clarify a Black woman's standpoint for Black women. In other words, Black feminist thought contains observations and interpretations about Afro-American womanhood that describe and explain different expressions of common themes.

Black women's insistence on self-definition, self-valuation, and the necessity for a Black female-centered analysis is significant for two reasons. First, defining and valuing one's consciousness of one's own self-defined standpoint in the face of images that foster a self-definition as the objectified "other" is an important way of resisting the dehumanization essential to systems of domination. The status of being the "other" implies being "other than" or different from the assumed norm of white male behavior. In this model, powerful white males define themselves as subjects, the true actors, and classify people of color and white women in terms of their position vis-a-vis this white male hub. Since Black women have been denied the authority to challenge these definitions, this model consists of images that define Black women as a negative other, the virtual antithesis of positive white male images. Moreover, as Britain and Maynard (1984:199) point out, "domination always involves the objectification of the dominated; all forms of oppression imply the devaluation of the subjectivity of the oppressed."

== Book description ==
In spite of the double burden of racial and gender discrimination, African-American women have developed a rich intellectual tradition that is not widely known. In Black Feminist Thought, originally published in 1990, Patricia Hill Collins set out to explore the words and ideas of Black feminist intellectuals and writers, both within the academy and without. Here Collins provides an interpretive framework for the work of such prominent Black feminist thinkers as Angela Davis, bell hooks, Alice Walker, and Audre Lorde. Drawing from fiction, poetry, music, and oral history, the result is a book that provided the first synthetic overview of Black feminist thought and its canon.

== Key concepts ==
=== Outsider-within ===
Patricia Hill Collins coins the term outsider-within in a former essay and redefines the term in her book to describe the experience of black women. In the book, she situates the term historically to describe the social location of black women in domestic work before World War II. While domestic work gave black women an opportunity "to see White elites, both actual and aspiring, from perspectives largely obscured from Black men and from these groups themselves", they were still economically exploited by their white employers. Collins asserts that black women cannot fully be members of feminist thought nor black social thought because the former assumes whiteness while the latter assumes maleness. The makeup of their identity - and consequently their experiences as black women - maintain their position as outsiders within spaces of oppression. However, as Collins notes, the black woman's position as an outsider-within provides her with a unique perspective on social, political, intellectual, and economic realities. Therefore, although black women are marginalized, they can bring a more nuanced outlook to feminist and social thought.

=== Intellectual activism ===
Collins pinpoints intellectual activism as a key process in developing black feminist thought. She articulates the reclaiming of "black feminist intellectual traditions" as one of the most important pillars of intellectual activism. Since the intellectual work of black women has been suppressed for so long, reclaiming and centering these works not only preserves the intellectual traditions of past black women but also encourages continued contributions to black feminist thought. Collins also notes the importance in "discovering, reinterpreting, and analyzing the ideas of subgroups within the larger collectivity of U.S. Black women who have been silenced" - meaning that one must also give equal attention to the groups of black women who have been especially marginalized, such as black lesbians. Collins describes the relationship between past and present intellectual traditions, suggesting the use of black feminists' theoretical frameworks of today - such as race, class, and gender - to interpret the intellectual traditions of previously silenced black women. Collins' focus goes beyond black female academics; she argues that all forms of works be considered as black women's social thought - which questions the definition of "intellectual" and allows for poetry, music, etc. to be considered as valid forms of social thought.

=== Balancing of intellectual activism ===
Black women's work within the academy faces a double meaning of exclusion: the exclusion of the work of Black Feminist Thought and the exclusion of their own selves from Black women academicians, all for the sake of visibility and acceptance within the academy. Through academic frameworks built around a White, male viewpoint, the work in having Black Feminist Thought recognized as legitimate is listed against varying frames of knowledge, and one in particular: Positivist. The Positivist methodology would require the exclusion of self from Black women academics with the requirements of distancing one's self and their emotions from their work along with hostile confrontations with superiors. The implied separation of the personal and professional goes against the inherent value-systems within Black communities that included varying areas of community, familial and religion. The intermeshing of these ideas also includes views that scholars view as feminist, with Black women having experiences pulling from their racial community and gender identity, their intellectual experiences, even through differences, still showcase similarities.

=== Matrix of domination ===
The matrix of domination refers to how intersections of oppression are structurally organized. It explains the way "structural, disciplinary, hegemonic, and interpersonal domains of power reappear across quite different forms of oppression". According to Associate Professor Sherie Randolph from Georgia Tech's School of History and Sociology, Black feminist theory challenges widely accepted perceptions and understandings along the intersecting lines of sex and race. The matrix of domination is made up of varying combinations of intersecting oppression such as race, gender, socioeconomic status, age, and sexuality. Collins' matrix of domination works in four different domains: the structural domain, the disciplinary domain, the hegemonic domain, and the interpersonal domain. The structural domain functions to organize power and oppression, the disciplinary manages oppression in attempts to sustain it, the hegemonic functions to legitimize oppression, and the interpersonal domain controls the interactions and consciousness of individuals. Although all black women are within the matrix of domination, the differences in the intersections of oppression make the experiences and the perspectives of black women differ.

=== Controlling images ===
Collins' discussion of controlling images focuses on the negative stereotypical representations and images of black women. These representations continue to oppress black women as they continue to perpetuate the dominant subject's definition of the object i.e. the black woman. The images' pervasive nature aid in sustaining intersecting oppression because they "[reflect] the dominant group's interest in maintaining Black women's subordination". These images are used to make black women's oppression seem natural and normal. Collins' critique on controlling images includes an analysis of the mammy, the welfare mother, and the jezebel. She explains that the images constitute different oppressions simultaneously: the mammy works to make the defeminized black women and all oppressive factors against her seem natural, the welfare mother works to make the economically unfit black women and all oppressive factors against her seem natural, and the jezebel works to make the hypersexual black women and all oppressive factors against her seem natural.

=== The power of images on Black girls ===
For young Black girls, the manipulation of images is also an influence. A 2016 study by University of Pennsylvania associate professor, Charlotte E. Jacobs, utilized Black Feminist Thought in an educational curriculum for Black girls in studying media depictions. Coupled with the inherent knowledge and experiences of Black girls, Jacobs explained how it is able to provide an "opportunity to develop critical media literacy skills." Knowing this framework aids in their own viewpoints and stances to media representations in understanding and deciphering the images and meaning behind such imagery, moving beyond the surface-images and using this framework as a means of combatting the prevalent, normalized view of characters and ideals within the media that are shown as representations of and for young Black girls.

=== Self-definition ===
Self-definition is "the power to name one's own reality" Collins articulates black women's resistance against controlling images as an important step for practicing self-definition. The rejection of the dominant group's definition of black women and black women's imposition of their own self-definition indicates a "collective Black women's consciousness". The expression of black women's consciousness and standpoint is an integral part of developing Black feminist thought. Collins notes the importance of safe spaces for black women, where self-definition is not clouded by further objectification or silencing. Affirmation is also an important part of Collins' call for self-definition, which can take place in the individual friendships and familial relationships of black women. Collins describes the process of self-definition as a "journey from internalized oppression to the 'free mind'" in order to emphasize its significance in the formation of the collective consciousness of black women.

== Reception ==
=== Media reception ===
With the success of Black Feminist Thought, Collins gained more recognition as a "social theorist, drawing from many intellectual traditions." Collins' work has now been published and used in many different fields including philosophy, history, psychology and sociology. Additionally, the University of Cincinnati named Collins the Charles Phelps Taft Professor of Sociology in 1996; she received Emeritus status in the Spring of 2005. Later, she became a professor of sociology at the University of Maryland, College Park, where she was named a Distinguished University Professor in 2006.

=== Reviews ===
In Data Feminism, Catherine D’Ignazio and Lauren F. Klein describe the book as a "landmark text".

Robert G. Newby wrote of the work that "Black Feminist Thought provides a synthesis of a body of knowledge that is crucial to putting in perspective the situation of Black Women and their place in the overall struggle to reduce and eliminate gender, race, and class inequalities. The book provides an analysis of the ideas of Black Women, particularly those ideas that reflect a consciousness in opposition to oppression." However, Newby also notes that one of the strengths of the work—the inclusion of "fiction" writers—is also something that warrants caution as these writers are not held to the same standards in their publications.

=== Awards ===
Black Feminist Thought won the Jessie Bernard Award of the American Sociological Association (ASA) in 1993 and the C. Wright Mills Award of The Society for the Study of Social Problems in 1990, among other awards from the Association of Women in Psychology and Black Women Historians.
