= Rita Banerji =

Indian author, photographer and activist

- Born: 1967 (age 58–59); India
- Citizenship: India
- Occupations: Author, feminist, activist
- Writing career
- Subjects: Feminism, Gendercide, Women's rights
- Movements: Women's rights, Human rights,
- Website: www.ritabanerji.com

Rita Banerji (1967) is an author, photographer and gender activist from India. Her non-fiction book Sex and Power: Defining History, Shaping Societies was published in 2008. She is the founder of the 50 Million Missing online campaign to raise awareness of female gendercide in India.

== Early career ==
Banerji started her career as an environmentalist specializing in Conservation Biology. In 1995 she received the Amy Lutz award in Plant Biology from the Association for Women in Science (AWIS) for her PhD work on the effects of acid rain on maize. Other awards and recognitions she has received include: Morgan Adams Award in Biology for PhD Research; Sigma Xi Scientific Research Society, Associate member; Botanical Society of America's Young Botanist Recognition Award; Charles A. Dana Fellowship for Research in Ecology; Howard Hughes Grant for research in genetics. She was also listed in Who's Who Among Students in American Universities and Colleges. Many of Banerji's projects had a gender perspective. She worked with the Chipko women's grassroots movement in India under the tutelage of eco-feminist Vandana Shiva and for the Institute for Policy Studies and World Resources Institute.

== Transition to Writing and Gender Activism ==
At the age of 30 Banerji returned to India and began to write on issues of gender equality and women's rights in India. Her writings and photos have been published in a range of journals and magazines in different countries. In 2009 she received the Apex Award of Excellence for Magazine and Journal Writing.

== Sex and Power ==
Banerji's non-fiction book Sex and Power:Defining History, Shaping Societies was first published in India in 2008. The book was the result of a five-year social and historical study of sex and sexuality in India. In the book Banerji examines why current day India is squeamish about sex, despite a historical openness about the subject shown by worship of lingam and yoni, erotic art in temples, and literature on the art and science of love-making such as the Kama Sutra. She concludes that a society's sexual mores vary over time and are linked to the social groups in power.

== The 50 Million Missing Campaign ==
In December 2006 Banerji started 50 Million Missing, an online advocacy campaign to raise awareness of female gendercide in India. The campaign was launched on Flickr, collecting thousands of photos of Indian girls and women from over 2400 photographers. Since its launch the campaign has grown and spread to other social networking sites and also runs information blogs. It is a zero-fund campaign and runs on community effort and participation. The campaign was a consequence of Banerji's book Sex and Power. She says, "The data on the systemic and mass-scale violence on Indian women and girls I was gathering for my book was playing out in its stark grotesqueness in my everyday reality. A baby girl is abandoned on the streets in my city, and as residents wait for the police to respond, street dogs kill her and start eating her…I saw the connection and for the first time felt uneasy, ashamed and outraged." Banerji contends that the three worst disasters that India faces in the 21st century, are population explosion, an AIDS epidemic, and the female gendercide. These she concludes are a result of India's deeply patriarchal and conservative approach to women and sexual morality, and the "socialized dichotomy" of men from women, and sex from the sacred. In an interview with The Big Issue in the North Banerji says the underlying problem with all three issues is a "virulent patriarchy that is self-indulgent...through [its practice of] multiple partners and irresponsible sex, and it essentially views women as sexual commodities to be used and discarded at will. A woman's only worth is in her production of sons for the continuation of the patriarchy. So daughters are routinely discarded before or soon after birth."

== Views on India’s female gendercide ==
Banerji has argued against the view that education and economic development are the solution to India's female gendercide. She states that an analysis of census data indicates that the gender ratio is most imbalanced in the top 20% of the population of India by wealth and education and that the ratio is closest to the natural norm in the bottom 20% of the same scale. She asserts that increased access to education, health care, jobs and higher earnings lead to more sex-selective abortion drawing a direct correlation between the number of educational degrees a woman has and the likelihood that she will eliminate unborn daughters. Banerji also claims that high-income professional women are also victims of dowry violence and murder in India. Their education and wealth is no protection, because they are unable to fight off the family and cultural pressures on them to remain in the marriage, regardless of the violence they are subjected to. Banerji contends that it is not economics or education, but rather a cultural misogyny that is the prime factor in India's female gendercide. She says this is most evident in how culture specific crimes like dowry murders and ‘honour' killings hound expatriate Indian women too, and sex-selected abortion is so prevalent, that the Indian communities in certain western countries like the United States, the United Kingdom, Canada, and Norway too have sex ratios that are abnormally skewed against females. Banerji asserts that gendercide needs to be recognised as a gender based hate crime against women, what Diana Russell has termed as ‘Femicide,’ and be dealt with in the same manner as other hate crimes based on race, religion or ethnicity.She explains that this lethal hatred of females is rooted in India’s history, religions and traditions, which over the centuries have created a socially permissive environment for extreme and deadly violence against females. She calls this "the acculturation of female homicide." She says,"terms [like] dowry death, femicide are each a method of female homicide that was [or still is] widely practised, widely accepted, and culturally-specific to India... When a practice acquires a name in a society, it becomes acceptable at the subconscious level of that community's collective thinking. Its premise becomes sacrosanct, and the lines between crime and culture, and what is permissible and reprehensible, become blurred. It is this deep, historically-rooted acculturation of female homicide that is sustaining female genocide in India."

== A Call for a Feminist Revolution in India ==
According to Banerji, India has not experienced a sexual revolution in the same way as that seen in Europe and North America, which established each woman's independent and individual rights and choices over her own body and sexuality. She believes it is very important for the women's movement in India to have such a revolution particularly in context of putting the gendercide in perspective for Indian society. As she points out, this is because, "It is about the recognition of women as individuals with certain fundamental rights, including that of safety and personal choices, which no one, not even the family, can violate... A girl or woman, within the Indian cultural context, is regarded as a family’s property. She does not have the ownership of her own body... And so it is the parents, the husbands, and in-laws who have the prerogative to decide and make the choices regarding a girl or a woman’s being. Whether or not she is allowed to live [before or] after birth...Who she can or cannot marry... Her husband is entitled to sex whether she wants it or not. He decides when and how many children he wants and what sex they should be. He and his family can torture her to extort more dowry wealth, or subjugate her to repeated pregnancies and excruciating abortions to rid female progeny as always is the case with female feticides...[There is] yet another constrictive, dictatorial authority that asserts its power over an individual woman’s being in India – that of culture and society. It decides what constitutes the prototype of a "good Indian woman" – and directs everything from her demeanor and costume, to what her roles and goals in society ought to be."

== Interviews ==
Women on Women's Rights: With Rita Banerji Women's Web, 26 September 2012

Alam Bains. Interview with Rita Banerji: Award-winning Author, Photographer, Gender Activist. Youth Ki Awaaz, 9 January 2012.

50 Million Missing Campaign. Heart to Heart Talks, 7 December 2011

Anjum Choudhry Nayyar. Author of Sex and Power, Rita Banerji Talks Marriage, Divorce and Raising Strong Daughters. Masalamommas: An Online Magazine for Today's Moms with a South Asian Connection, 31 October 2011

Colin Todhunter. Delink Wealth and Weddings. Deccan Herald. May 2011.

Soraya Nulliah. Interview with Rita Banerji – Part I. My He(Art) Full Blog. 8 March 2011.

Soraya Nulliah. Interview with Rita Banerji – Part II My He(Art) Full Blog. 13 April 2011

India's Silent Gender Cleansing. The Asia Mag! 3 April 2009.

Power at Play. The Indian Express, 18 March 2009.

Ciara Leeming. Author Q and A: Rita Banerji. The Big Issue in the North, 20–26 July 2009.

Fifty Million Missing Women: Rita Banerji Fights Female Genocide. Mount Holyoke Alumnae Quarterly, 29 August 2008.

Anasuya Basu. Sex Through the Ages. The Telegraph, 15 March 2009.

Colin Todhunter. Where Have They All Gone? The Deccan Herald, 11 October 2008
