= Luigi D'Ignazio =

Italian footballer

Personal information
- Date of birth: 13 March 1998 (age 28)
- Place of birth: San Giorgio a Cremano, Italy
- Height: 1.75 m (5 ft 9 in)
- Position: Left-back

Youth career
- Napoli

Senior career*
| Years | Team | Apps | (Gls) |
| 2017–2021 | Napoli | 0 | (0) |
| 2017 | → Gavorrano (loan) | 0 | (0) |
| 2017 | → Cuneo (loan) | 7 | (0) |
| 2018–2019 | → Bari (loan) | 6 | (1) |
| 2019 | → Sambenedettese (loan) | 8 | (0) |
| 2019–2020 | → Cavese (loan) | 12 | (0) |
| 2020 | → Carrarese (loan) | 1 | (0) |
| 2020–2021 | → Turris (loan) | 20 | (1) |
| 2021–2022 | ASD Caserta Neapolis | | |
- * Club domestic league appearances and goals as of 22 February 2026

Luigi D'Ignazio (born 13 March 1998) is an Italian footballer who plays as a left back.

== Club career ==
He made his Serie C debut for Cuneo on 15 October 2017 in a game against Livorno.

On 17 January 2019, he joined Sambenedettese on loan until the end of the 2018–19 season.

On 17 July 2019 he joined Cavese on a season-long loan. On 30 January 2020 he moved on loan to Carrarese.

On 18 September 2020 he moved to Turris on a season-long loan.
