= Brian Lowery =

American social psychologist (1974)

Brian S. Lowery (born 1974) is an American social psychologist.

Lowery obtained a bachelor's degree from the University of Illinois at Urbana–Champaign in 1996, and subsequently began graduate study at the University of California, Los Angeles, where he earned a master's degree in 1998 and a doctorate in 2002. He began teaching at Stanford University upon graduation, and was later named Walter Kenneth Kilpatrick Professor of Organizational Behavior.

== Bibliography ==
- Lowery, Brian (2023). Selfless: The Social Creation of "You". New York: Harper. ISBN 978-0-06-291300-5.
