= Fred D'Ignazio =

American writer (born 1949)

Silvio Frederick D'Ignazio III
- D'Ignazio and his daughter in the early 1980s
- Born: January 6, 1949 (age 77); Bryn Mawr, Pennsylvania
- Occupation: Author
- Children: 3, including Catherine

Fred D'Ignazio (born January 6, 1949) is an American author, educator, and television commentator. He was born in Bryn Mawr, Pennsylvania and is considered to be one of the world's leading pioneers in multimedia-based education. From 1972 to 1976, he was an assistant editor for The Futurist magazine published by the World Future Society. In the 1980s and 1990s he was an associate editor and columnist for COMPUTE! and COMPUTE!'s Gazette and a technology commentator on ABC's Good Morning America. He is also the author of over 30 non-fiction books on science and technology, as well as a series of juvenile science fiction novels.

D'Ignazio received an M.A. from the Fletcher School of Law and Diplomacy in 1971, and pursued further studies at the American University's Washington College of Law. He is married and has three children, whose experiences with home computers he sometimes wrote about in his magazine columns.

== Bibliography ==
- Fred D'Ignazio. Chip Mitchell: The Case of the Stolen Computer Brains. New York: E P Dutton, 1982.
- ———. Chip Mitchell: The Case of the Robot Warriors. New York: E P Dutton, 1984.
- ———. Robot Odyssey 1: Escape from Robotropolis. New York: Tor, 1988.
- ———. The Star Wars Question & Answer Book about Computers. New York: Random House, 1983.
- ———. Katie and the Computer. Creative Computing Press, 1979.
- ———. The Computer Parade. Creative Computing Press, 1983.
- ———. Working Robots. Dutton Books, 1981.
- ———. Electronic Games. Franklin Watts, 1982.
- ———. The Apple Playground. Hayden Books, 1984.
- ———. The Atari Playground. Hayden Books, 1984.
- ———. The VIC Playground. Hayden Books, 1984.
- ———. The Commodore 64 Playground. Hayden Books, 1984.
- ———. The TI Playground. Hayden Books, 1984.
- ———. Commodore 64 in Wonderland. Hayden Books, 1984.
- ———. TI in Wonderland. Hayden Books, 1984.
- ———. VIC in Wonderland. Hayden Books, 1984.
- ———. Apple in Wonderland. Hayden Books, 1984.
- ———. Atari in Wonderland. Hayden Books, 1984.
- ———. Invent Your Own Computer Games. Franklin Watts, 1983.
- ——— and Allen L. Wold. Artificial Intelligence. Franklin Watts, 1984.
- ——— The New Astronomy: Probing the Secrets of Space. Franklin Watts, 1982.
- ——— Chip Mitchell: Case Of Chocolate Covered Bugs. New York: E P Dutton, 1986.
- ——— Chip Mitchell: Case of the Robot Warriors. London: Pied Piper, 1987.
- ——— How to Get Intimate With Your Computer. New York: Doubleday, 1984.
- ——— The Creative Kid’s Guide to Home Computers. New York: Doubleday, 1981.
- ——— Messner’s Introduction to Computers. New York: Simon & Schuster, 1983.
- ——— Small Computers: Exploring Their Technology and Future. New York: Franklin Watts, 1983.
- ——— Learning and Having Fun with IBM Personal Computers. Hayden Books, 1985.
- ——— Apple Building Blocks: Featuring Denby the Robot. Hayden Books, 1985.
- ——— Computing Together: A Parents and Teachers Guide to Using Computers with Young Children. Compute! Books, 1984.
- ——— The Color Computer Playground. Hayden Books, 1984.
