= Lauren Klein =

American academic

Lauren F. Klein
- Klein in 2024
- Born: United States
- Occupation: Professor
- Employer: Emory University
- Known for: digital humanities, data feminism

Lauren Klein is an American academic who works as a professor and director of the Atlanta Interdisciplinary AI Network and the Digital Humanities Lab at Emory University. Klein is best known for her work in digital humanities and for co-authoring the book Data Feminism with Catherine D'Ignazio.

== Early life and education ==
Klein studied comparative literature and computer science at Harvard University. Before returning to graduate school, she worked as a software developer and bike messenger. She received her Ph.D. in English and American Studies from the Graduate Center, CUNY in 2011.

== Career and research ==
Klein joined the School of Literature, Media, and Communication at the Georgia Institute of Technology as an assistant professor, where she taught in the Computational Media program. She also founded the Digital Humanities Lab there. Her lab’s work on the Shape of History project brought new attention to the forgotten data visualization scheme created by Elizabeth Palmer Peabody in the nineteenth century. In 2017, she was named one of the "rising stars of digital humanities" by Inside Higher Ed.

Klein’s research, which combines quantitative methods and archival research, proposes a way to "integrate race, gender, and postcolonial theory with computer learning to develop methodologies for performing research in bias-laden archives." She is the author of An Archive of Taste: Race and Eating in the Early United States, which was published by the University of Minnesota Press, and Data by Design: Visualization and Power from Abolition to the Dawn of Data Science, which was published by MIT Press. She is the co-author, with Catherine D’Ignazio, of Data Feminism, which was also published by MIT Press. Data Feminism was named a "must-read" book by WIRED Magazine and a 2021 PROSE Award finalist. Klein is also co-editor, with Matthew K. Gold, of the Debates in the Digital Humanities book series, a "digital humanities bellwether" which offers a "hybrid model for open-access texts to be published in both experimental online spaces and traditional print forms."

In 2019, Klein joined Emory University as an associate professor of English and Quantitative Theory and Methods. In 2022, Klein was named the Winship Distinguished Research Professor of English and Quantitative Theory and Methods.

== Works ==
- D'Ignazio, Catherine; F. Klein, Lauren (October 3, 2023). Data Feminism. The MIT Press. p. 328. ISBN 9780262547185.
- Klein, Lauren F. (12 May 2020). "An Archive of Taste: Race and Eating in the Early United States". University of Minnesota Press. doi:10.5749/j.ctv10vkzpd. ISBN 978-1-4529-6394-5.
- Klein, Lauren F. (October 20, 2026). Data by Design: Visualization and Power from Abolition to the Dawn of Data Science. The MIT Press.
