= Data Feminism =

2020 book

- Author: Catherine D’Ignazio and Lauren F. Klein
- Published: 2020
- Publisher: MIT Press
- ISBN: 978-0-262-04400-4

Data Feminism is a 2020 book written by American professors Catherine D’Ignazio and Lauren F. Klein. Part literature review and part call to action, Data Feminism provides a framework for data scientists seeking to learn how feminism can help them work toward justice and for feminists who want to focus their efforts on the growing field of data science. Through seven chapters, Data Feminism provides examples of data biases and injustices, as well as strategies to redress them. In doing so, D’Ignazio and Klein suggest that data feminism is "a way of thinking about data, both their uses and their limits, that is informed by direct experience, by a commitment to action, and by intersectional feminist thought".

The authors argue that the key idea of data feminism has gone mostly unacknowledged in data science: that power is not distributed equally in the world. Data science is a form of power, and it can be used to uphold existing hierarchies or, alternatively, to discover and redress injustices. The book consistently emphasizes that data never “speak for themselves" and examines how challenges to the male/female binary can help challenge other hierarchical (and empirically wrong) classification systems. The authors explain how, for example, a better understanding of emotions challenges and improves ideas about effective data visualization and how the concept of invisible labor exposes the significant human efforts behind technologies and data-related work.

The authors apply an intersectional feminist framework to data science. Using this framework, the authors examine intertwined structural forces of power such as sex, race, sexuality, and class. The authors also explicitly focus on data justice, as opposed to data ethics, arguing that data ethics and its focus on fairness and biases create structures that protect dominant powers.

Data Feminism is free to read online at https://data-feminism.mitpress.mit.edu/.

== Chapters ==
The chapters are organized according to seven guiding principles (see below):

1. Examine power
2. Challenge power
3. Elevate emotion and embodiment
4. Rethink binaries and hierarchies
5. Embrace pluralism
6. Consider context
7. Make labor visible

== Reception ==
After the publication of Data Feminism in 2020, D'Ignazio's and Klein's approach received critical acclaim in academic reviews for their writing and scholarship, with Daniene Byrne noting in the IEEE Technology and Society magazine how the text "skillfully combines two distinct academic areas of expertise, feminist scholarship, and data science." The authors have also received praise for embodying their intersectional feminism (particularly the book's seventh principle, "make labor visible") in the pages of their bibliography by providing a problem-led breakdown of their sources, as well for their open community review process.

Data Feminism has also been cited as an inspiration and framework for civic technology and feminist data initiatives such as the Urban Belonging project, which was initiated in 2021 by a collective of planners and scholars with the ambition of mapping lived experiences of underrepresented communities in urban Europe. Folding into data feminism, this research experiments, among other things, with making maps and visualizations that break hierarchies, challenge binaries, and expose power dynamics.
