= Catherine D'Ignazio =

American academic

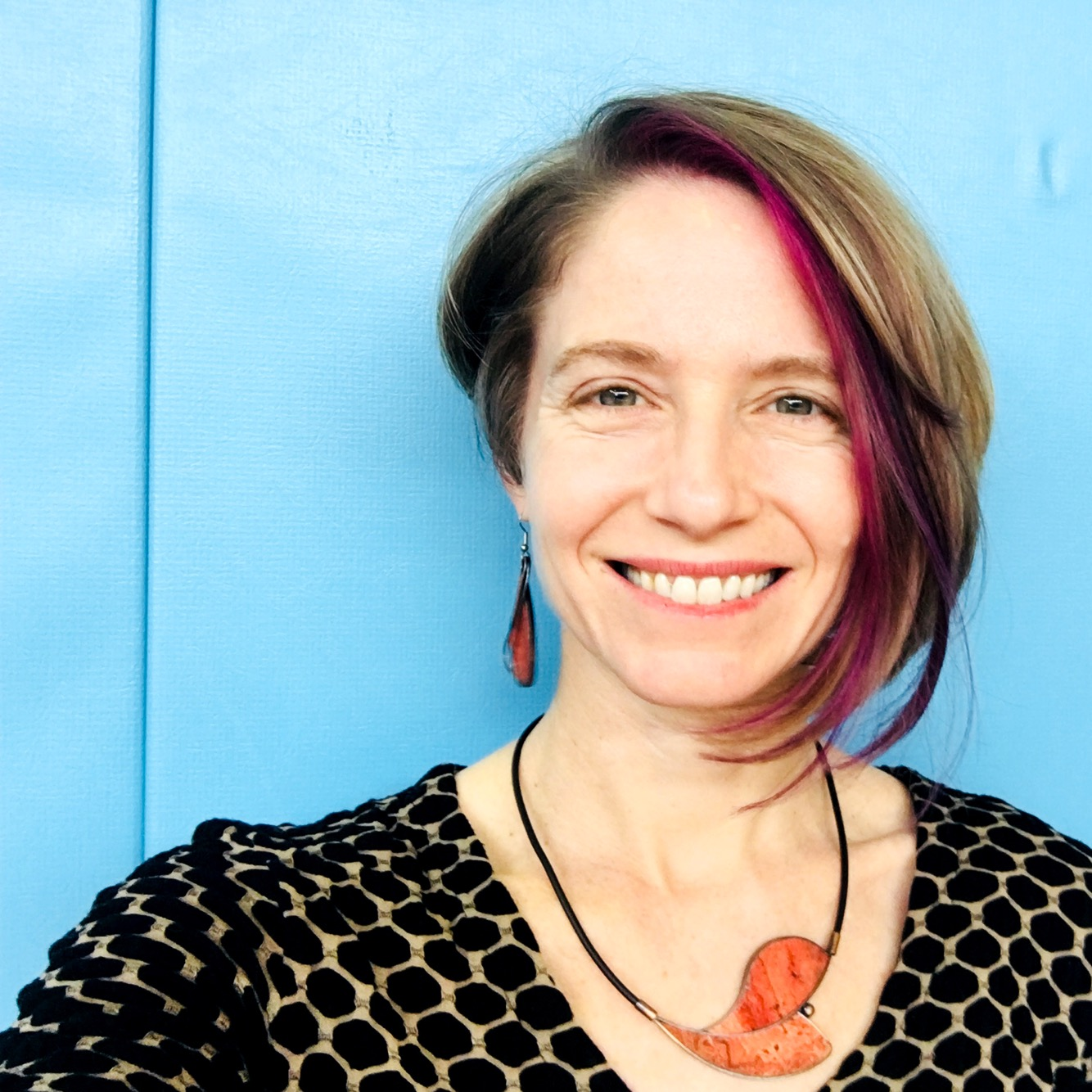
- Born: United States
- Other name: kanarinka
- Occupation: Associate professor
- Employer: MIT
- Known for: Data feminism

Catherine D'Ignazio (also known as kanarinka) is an American professor, artist, and software developer who focuses on feminism and data literacy. She is the director of the Data + Feminism lab at MIT. D'Ignazio is best known for her hackathons, such as "Make the Breast Pump Not Suck", and for her books; Data Feminism, co-authored with Lauren Klein,and Counting Feminicide: Data Feminism in Action. D'Ignazio currently lives and works in Cambridge, MA.In May 2025, D'Ignazio received the Emilie Jäger Award of the Faculty of Science for advancing diversity, equality, inclusion, and justice in academia.

== Early life and education ==
D'Ignazio was born in Chapel Hill, North Carolina and grew up in North Carolina, Virginia, Alabama, and Michigan. Her father, Fred D'Ignazio, is an American author, educator, and television commentator. D'Ignazio received her Bachelor of Arts (B.A.) degree in international relations from Tufts University. She went on to receive a Master of Fine Arts (MFA) in studio art, design and theory from Maine College of Art and a Master of Science (M.S.) in media arts and sciences from MIT in 2014.

== Career ==
D'Ignazio works as an assistant professor at MIT and has published several works in her field of study as well as an acclaimed book, Data Feminism. She has organized several women's health hackathons, including "Make the Breast Pump Not Suck," which has now been featured in the Philadelphia Museum of Art's exhibition, Designs for Different Futures. She has also worked on news recommendation systems, and different types of data visualization.

D'Ignazio started to work in software development and taught for seven years in the Digital + Media graduate program at Rhode Island School of Design. She then moved on to work in the Journalism Department at Emerson College, as an Assistant Professor of Data Visualization and Civic Media. Having years of experience as a professor, she then became an Assistant Professor of Urban Science and Planning in the Department of Urban Studies and Planning at MIT. D'Ignazio maintains this role today, and also acts as the Director of the Data + Feminism Lab.

== Works ==
- D'Ignazio, Catherine (2024). Counting feminicide: data feminism in action. Cambridge, Massachusetts: The MIT Press. ISBN 9780262048873.
- D'Ignazio, Catherine; F. Klein, Lauren (October 3, 2023). Data Feminism. The MIT Press. p. 328. ISBN 9780262547185.
- Ed. with Thylstrup, Nanna Bonde (2021). Uncertain archives: critical keywords for big data. Cambridge, [Massachusetts]: The MIT Press. ISBN 9780262539883.
