= Pre-existence =

Belief that souls exist before conception

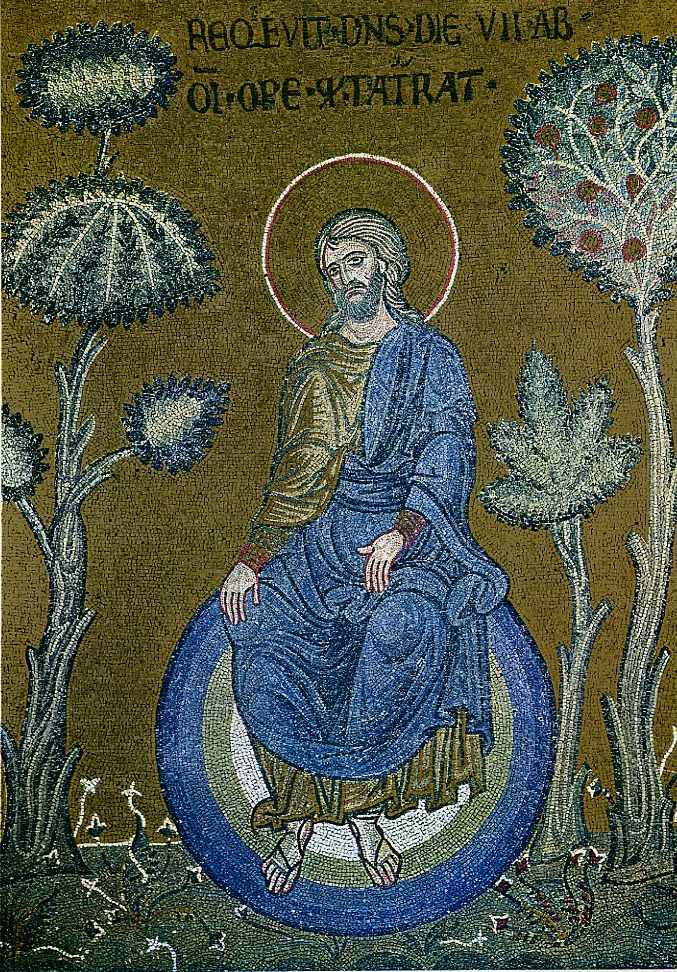
God resting after creation – Christ depicted as the creator of the world prior to his incarnation as Jesus, Byzantine mosaic in Monreale, Sicily.

Pre-existence, premortal existence, beforelife, or life before birth, are terms for the belief that each individual human soul existed before conception, and at some point before birth enters or is placed into the body. Concepts of pre-existence can encompass either the belief that the soul came into existence at some time prior to conception or the belief that the soul is eternal. Alternative positions are traducianism and creationism, which both hold that the individual human soul does not come into existence until conception or later. It is to be distinguished from preformation, which is about physical existence and applies to all living things. (Note: Ancient Greek thought and Islam affirm pre-existence, but it is generally denied in Christianity.)

== Ancient Greek thought ==
Plato believed in the pre-existence of the soul, which tied in with his innatism. He thought that we are born with knowledge from a previous life that is subdued at birth and must be relearned. He saw all attainment of knowledge not as acquiring new information, but as remembering previously known information.

== Baha'i Faith ==
Baháʼí literature refers in a number of places to at least four key dimensions of pre-existence. Firstly, that the individual soul of a human being comes into being at the time of conception and only thereafter is eternal; in other words, it is not pre-existent. Secondly, in distinction to the above, that the souls of the world's greatest spiritual teachers, the founders of world religions, are pre-existent. Thirdly, that God, a reality which human consciousness can not comprehend, is pre-existent, that is he exists prior to time and to his creation. Fourthly, that the relationship between God and the phenomenal or contingent world is one of emanation, as the rays of the sun are to the earth. In other words, the pre-existent world of God remains separate from and does not descend into his creation.

== Buddhism ==
In Buddhist cosmology, saṃsāra is the cycle of life and death. When a person dies in earth its human soul is born into the Naraka (underworld or the "purgatories" of the souls) and afterwards it is reborn on earth. Yama, a dharmapala (wrathful god), is said to judge the dead and preside over the Narakas and the cycle.

A being is born into a Naraka as a direct result of its accumulated actions (karma) and resides there for a finite period of time (it varies from hundreds of millions to sextillions of years, but these periods are equivalent to hours or even years in earth time) until that karma has achieved its full result. After its karma is used up, it will be reborn in one of the higher worlds as the result of karma that had not yet ripened. The cycle is completed or finished when the soul reach the Nirvana.

== Chinese mythology ==
In Chinese mythology, the Naihe Bridge (奈何桥), also called the Bridge of Forgetfulness, connects earth with the Diyu ("earth prison"), that is the realm of the dead or purgatory. It is typically depicted as a subterranean maze with various levels and chambers, to which souls are taken after death to atone for the sins they committed when they were alive. The number of levels in Diyu it is said to be three, four, ten or even Eighteen "courts", each of which is ruled by a judge, collectively known as the Yama Kings. The god of the dead is Yanluo Wang, it oversees the kings of the courts. Ox-Head and Horse-Face are the guardians of Diyu, and their role is the capture of human souls who have died and bring them before the courts of Hell, where they are rewarded or punished based on the actions performed in their lifetime. Legend has it that the dead who have committed serious sins in life cannot cross the Naihe Bridge and will be pushed into the "Blood River Pool" by Ox-Head and Horse-Face to suffer the torture of insects, ants and snakes, while the dead who have done good deeds will be able to cross the bridge very easily.

The goddess of forgetfulness, Meng Po, serves Meng Po Soup (孟婆汤) on the Naihe Bridge. This soup wipes the memory of the persons before they cross the bridge so they can reincarnate into their next life without the burdens of the previous life. She awaits the dead souls at the entrance of the 9th round (Fengdu). In some variations she is referred as Lady Meng Jiang

== Christianity ==
A concept of pre-existence was advanced by Origen, a second and third-century Church Father. Origen believed that each human soul was created by God at some time prior to conception. He wrote that already "one of [his] predecessors" had interpreted the Scripture to teach pre-existence, which seems to be a reference to the Jewish philosopher Philo.

Some scholars, including John Behr and Marguerite Harl, argue that this idea, condemned by the church, may have been taught by some later Origenists, but that Origen himself was orthodox in this regard and "never used the terms 'pre-existence of souls' or 'pre-existent intellects', and that Origen was talking about realities outside of time and not about any concept of temporality before our time. Such orthodox understandings of Origen also show up in Maximus the Confessor and in the idea of an atemporal fall as taught by Christian theologians Sergei Bulgakov and David Bentley Hart.

Church Fathers Tertullian and Jerome held to traducianism and creationism, respectively, and pre-existence was condemned as heresy in the Second Council of Constantinople in AD 553.

Origen referenced Romans 9:11-14 as evidence for his position:

For the children being not yet born, neither having done any good or evil, that the purpose of God according to election might stand, not of works, but of him that calleth; It was said unto her, The elder shall serve the younger. As it is written, Jacob have I loved, but Esau have I hated. What shall we say then? Is there unrighteousness with God? God forbid.

— "Romans 9: 11-14".

Origen argued that God could not love Jacob and hate Esau until Jacob had done something worthy of love and Esau had done something worthy of hatred and so the passage means only that Jacob and Esau had not yet done good or evil in this life and their conduct before this life was the reason why Esau would serve Jacob.

Origen also referenced Jeremiah 1:5:

Before I formed thee in the belly, I knew thee; and before thou camest forth out of the womb, I sanctified thee, and I ordained thee a prophet unto the nations.

He brought forth a question:

How could his soul and its images be formed along with his body, who, before he was created in the womb, is said to be known to God, and was sanctified by Him before his birth?

Those who reject pre-existence, which would be every Christian denomination that accepts the conclusions of the Second Council of Constantinople (i.e., all Catholics and Eastern Orthodox Christians and many Protestants), simply see Jeremiah 1:5 as another passage about God's foreknowledge. This Ecumenical Council explicitly stated "If anyone asserts the fabulous pre-existence of souls, and shall assert the monstrous restoration which follows from it: let him be anathema."

=== Latter Day Saint ===
The concept of premortal life is an early and fundamental doctrine of Mormonism. In the faith's eponymous text, the Book of Mormon, published on March 26, 1830, the premortal spirit of Christ appears in human form and explains that individuals were created in the beginning in the image of Christ. In 1833, early in the Latter Day Saint movement, its founder Joseph Smith taught that human souls are co-eternal with God the Father just as Jesus is co-eternal with God the Father, "Man was also in the beginning with God. Intelligence, or the light of truth, was not created or made, neither indeed can be."

== Hinduism ==
In the Bhagavad Gita, considered by Hindus to be a most holy scripture, Krishna tells Arjuna; "Never was there a time when I did not exist, nor you, nor all these kings; nor in the future shall any of us cease to be." Hinduism teaches reincarnation, meaning that within this framework, the soul has always pre-existed in another form. Hindu philosophy holds that the soul is eternal and pre-exists the physical body, undergoing successive births and deaths according to its accumulated karma. The ultimate goal of life is to attain moksha (liberation) from the cycle of reincarnation through the realization of the soul's true nature and its unity with the universal consciousness (Brahman).

== Islam ==
In Islam, all souls are believed to have been created in adult form before earthly life at the same time the God created the father of mankind, Adam. The Qur'an recounts the story of when the descendants of Adam were brought forth before God to testify that God alone is the Lord of creation and so only God is worthy of worship and so on the Day of Judgement, people cannot use the excuse that they worshipped others only because they were following the ways of their ancestors. Humans do not remember, as they are born with an undeveloped mind (leaving only an innate awareness that God exists and is one, known as the Fitra), and God decreed when every human would be born into the physical world.

== See also ==
- Atemporal fall
- Afterlife
- Bodhisattva
- Gnosticism
- Hypostasis of the Archons
- Kabbalah
- Manichaeism
- Near-birth experience
- Origenism
- Scientology
- Spiritualism
- Western esotericism
- Past life regression
- Reincarnation
