= History of Christian thought on abortion =

Christianity and abortion has a long and complex history. There is scholarly disagreement on how early Christians felt about abortion. Some scholars have concluded that early Christians took a nuanced stance on what is now called abortion, and that at different and in separate places early Christians have taken different stances. Other scholars have concluded that early Christians considered abortion a sin at all stages; though there is disagreement over their thoughts on what type of sin it was and how grave a sin it was held to be. Some early Christians believed that the embryo did not have a soul from conception, and consequently opinion was divided as to whether early abortion was murder or ethically equivalent to murder. Some early Christian texts nonetheless condemned abortion without distinction: Luker mentions the Didache, Clement of Alexandria, Tertullian, and Saint Basil. Early church councils punished women for abortions that were combined with other sexual crimes, as well as makers of abortifacient drugs, but, like some early Church Fathers such as Basil of Caesarea, did not make distinction between "formed" and "unformed" fetuses.

While Gregory of Nyssa and Maximus the Confessor held that human life already began at conception, Augustine of Hippo affirmed Aristotle's concepts of ensoulment occurring some time after conception, after which point abortion was to be considered homicide, while still maintaining the condemnation of abortion at any time from conception onward. For most of Western European history, the consensus of Christian thinkers was ensoulment occurred around 40 days after conception.

Thomas Aquinas reiterated Aristotle's views of successive souls: vegetative, animal, and rational. This would be the Catholic Church's position until 1869, when the limitation of automatic excommunication to abortion of a formed fetus was removed, a change that has been interpreted as an implicit declaration that conception was the moment of ensoulment. Most early penitentials imposed equal penances for abortion whether early-term or late-term, but later penitentials in the Middle Ages normally distinguished between the two, imposing heavier penances for late-term abortions and a less severe penance was imposed for the sin of abortion "before [the foetus] has life".

Contemporary Christian denominations have nuanced positions, thoughts and teachings about abortion, especially in extenuating circumstances. The Catholic Church, the Eastern Orthodox Church, Oriental Orthodoxy, and most evangelical Protestants oppose deliberate abortion as immoral, while allowing what is sometimes called indirect abortion, namely, an action that does not seek the death of the fetus as an end or a means but that is followed by the death as a side effect. Some mainline Protestant denominations such as the Episcopal Church, United Church of Christ, and the Evangelical Lutheran Church of America, among others, are more permissive of abortion. The Waldensian Evangelical Church has also favored the legal right to an abortion. More generally, some Christian denominations can be considered opposed to abortion while others may be considered in favor of abortion rights.

== Influences ==
Both ancient Greek thought and ancient Jewish thought are considered to have affected early Christian thought about abortion. Some early Christians adhered to Aristotle's belief in delayed ensoulment, and consequently did not see abortion before ensoulment as homicide. Lars Østnor says this view was only "presaged" by Augustine, who belongs to a period later than that of early Christianity. According to David Albert Jones, this distinction appeared among Christian writers only in the late fourth and early fifth century, while the earlier writers made no distinction between formed and unformed, a distinction explicitly rejected by 4th-century Saint Basil of Caesarea, who also, though earlier than Saint Augustine, does not belong to the early-Christianity period. While the Hebrew text of the Bible only required a fine for the loss of a fetus, whatever its stage of development, the Jewish Septuagint translation, which the early Christians used, introduced a distinction between a formed and an unformed fetus and treated destruction of the former as murder. It has been commented that "the LXX could easily have been used to distinguish human from non-human fetuses and homicidal from non-homicidal abortions, yet the early Christians, until the time of Augustine in the fifth century, did not do so."

The view of early Christians on the moment of ensoulment is also said to have been not the Aristotelian, but the Pythagorean:

As early as the time of Tertullian in the third century, Christianity had absorbed the Pythagorean Greek view that the soul was infused at the moment of conception. Though this view was confirmed by St. Gregory of Nyssa a century later, it would not be long before it would be rejected in favour of the Septuagintal notion that only a formed fetus possessed a human soul. While Augustine speculated whether "animation" might be present prior to formation, he determined that abortion could only be defined as homicide once formation had occurred. Nevertheless, in common with all early Christian thought, Augustine condemned abortion from conception onward.

Scholars generally agree that abortion was performed in the classical world, but there is disagreement about the frequency with which abortion was performed and which cultures influenced early Christian thought on abortion. Some writers point to the Hippocratic Oath as evidence that condemnation of abortion was not a novelty introduced by the early Christians. Some writers state that there is evidence that some early Christians believed, as the Greeks did, in delayed ensoulment, or that a fetus does not have a soul until quickening, and therefore early abortion was not murder; Luker says there was disagreement on whether early abortion was wrong. Other writers say that early Christians considered abortion a sin even before ensoulment. According to some, the magnitude of the sin was, for the early Christians, on a level with general sexual immorality or other lapses; according to others, they saw it as "an evil no less severe and social than oppression of the poor and needy". The society in which Christianity expanded was one in which abortion, infanticide and exposition were commonly used to limit the number of children (especially girls) that a family had to support. These methods were often used also when a pregnancy or birth resulted from sexual licentiousness, including marital infidelity, prostitution and incest, and Bakke holds that these contexts cannot be separated from abortion in early Christianity. Johannes M. Röskamp agrees that one reason for Christian disapproval of abortion was that it was linked with attempts to conceal adultery, but stresses that the main reason was the "all new concept" of concern for the fetus,which, Michael J. Gorman declares, "distinguishes the Christian position from all pagan disapproval of abortion".

== Early Christianity ==
Early Christian thought on abortion is interpreted in different ways. At different times, early Christians held different beliefs about abortion, while yet considering it a grievous sin.

The earliest Christian texts on abortion condemn it with "no mention of any distinction in seriousness between the abortion of a formed foetus and that of an unformed embryo".

According to sociologist Kristin Luker:

After the beginning of the Christian era... legal regulation of abortion as existed in the Roman Empire was designed primarily to protect the rights of fathers rather than rights of embryos.
...induced abortion is ignored in the most central Judeo-Christian writings: it was not mentioned in the Christian or the Jewish Bible, or in the Jewish Mishnah or Talmud. Abortion, it is true, was denounced in early Christian writings such as the Didache and by early Christian authors such as Clement of Alexandria, Tertullian, and St. Basil. But church councils, such as those of Elvira and Ancyra, which were called to specify the legal groundwork for Christian communities, outlined penalties only for those women who committed abortion after a sexual crime such as adultery or prostitution. Most importantly, perhaps, from the third century A.D. onward, Christian thought was divided as to whether early abortion – the abortion of an "unformed" embryo – was in fact murder. Different sources of church teachings and laws simply did not agree on the penalties for abortion or on whether early abortion is wrong.

However, that the early Christians agreed in rejecting abortion is more generally accepted. They condemned it as a serious sin, even before ensoulment. While agreeing that abortion was seen as a sin, some writers consider that those Christians viewed early abortion as on the same level as general sexual immorality, or that they saw it as a grave contra-life sin like contraception and sterilization, while others hold that it was for them "an evil no less severe and social than oppression of the poor and needy". Even in cases where abortion was seen as more than a sexual crime, the practice was still sometimes associated with sexual immorality.

=== Patristic writings ===
In the late 1st century or early 2nd century, the Didache explicitly condemned abortion, as did the Apocalypse of Peter in the 2nd century. Some early Christians considered abortion wrong in all circumstances, and early synods imposed penalties for abortions that were combined with some form of sexual crime and on the making of abortifacient drugs: the early 4th-century Synod of Elvira imposed denial of communion even at the point of death on those who committed the "double crime" of adultery and subsequent abortion, and the Synod of Ancyra imposed ten years of exclusion from communion on manufacturers of abortion drugs and on women aborting what they conceived by fornication (previously, such women and the makers of drugs for abortion were excluded until on the point of death). Basil the Great (330-379) imposed the same ten-year exclusion on any woman who purposely destroyed her unborn child, even if unformed. Abortion was sometimes regarded as worse than murder, but Basil thus imposed for it a lesser penance than the twenty-year exclusion that he imposed for intentional homicide, apparently because abortion was likely to be due to fear and shame rather than malice.

Several historians have written that prior to the 19th century most Catholic authors did not regard termination of pregnancy before "quickening" or "ensoulment" as an abortion. In the 13th century, physician and cleric Peter of Spain wrote a book called Thesaurus Pauperum (Treasure of the Poor) containing a long list of early-stage abortifacients, including rue, pennyroyal, and other mints. Peter of Spain is generally identified with the ecclesiastic Peter Juliani, who was elected Pope John XXI in 1276.

Some prominent theologians, such as John Chrysostom and Thomas Sanchez, believed that post-quickening abortion was sinful, but less sinful than deliberate contraception.

== Later Christian thought on abortion ==
From the 4th to 16th Century AD, Christian philosophers, while maintaining the condemnation of abortion as wrong, had varying stances on whether abortion was murder. Under the first Christian Roman emperor Constantine, there was a relaxation of attitudes toward abortion and exposure of children. Bakke writes, "Since an increasing number of Christian parents were poor and found it difficult to look after their children, the theologians were forced to take into account this situation and reflect anew on the question. This made it possible to take a more tolerant attitude toward poor people who exposed their children."

=== Ensoulment ===
Augustine believed that an early abortion is not murder because, according to the Aristotelian concept of delayed ensoulment, the soul of a fetus at an early stage is not present, a belief that passed into canon law. Nonetheless, he harshly condemned the procedure: "Sometimes, indeed, this lustful cruelty, or if you please, cruel lust, resorts to such extravagant methods as to use poisonous drugs to secure barrenness; or else, if unsuccessful in this, to destroy the conceived seed by some means previous to birth, preferring that its offspring should rather perish than receive vitality; or if it was advancing to life within the womb, should be slain before it was born."(De Nube et Concupiscentia 1.17 (15))

Thomas Aquinas and Pope Innocent III also believed that a fetus does not have a soul until "quickening," or when the fetus begins to kick and move, and therefore early abortion was not murder, though later abortion was. Aquinas held that abortion was still wrong, even when not murder, regardless of when the soul entered the body. Pope Stephen V and Pope Sixtus V opposed abortion at any stage of pregnancy.

== Protestant Reformation ==
In general, the Protestant Reformers retained the teaching of their time against abortion. Neither Martin Luther nor John Calvin wrote any individual work discussing the question of abortion in particular, though both argued, "in fragmentary passages, for the full humanity of the fetus from its earliest stage."

While lecturing on Genesis 25:1–4, Luther noted:

God wanted to teach and attest that the beginning of children is wonderfully pleasing to Him, in order that we might realize that He upholds and defends His Word when He says: "Be fruitful." He is not hostile to children as we are. ... How great, therefore, the wickedness of human nature is! How many girls there are who prevent conception and kill and expel tender fetuses, although procreation is the work of God!

In 1542, Luther wrote a pamphlet in which he distinguished between women who suffer miscarriages through no fault of their own and "those females who resent being pregnant, deliberately neglect their child, or go so far as to strangle or destroy it." And in a 1544 letter, Luther strongly condemned a woman who had been a guest in his house for, among other reasons, asking his maid to "jump on her body in order to kill the fetus."

John Calvin, in his commentary on Exodus 21:22, wrote:

[T]he fœtus, though enclosed in the womb of its mother, is already a human being, (homo,) and it is almost a monstrous crime to rob it of the life which it has not yet begun to enjoy. If it seems more horrible to kill a man in his own house than in a field, because a man's house is his place of most secure refuge, it ought surely to be deemed more atrocious to destroy a fœtus in the womb before it has come to light.
