= Ensoulment =

Moment a being is said to gain a soul

In religion and ancient philosophy, ensoulment (from the verb ensoul meaning to endow or imbue with a soul—earliest ascertainable word use: 1605) is the moment at which a human or other being gains a soul. Some belief systems maintain that a soul is newly created within a developing child; others, especially in religions that believe in reincarnation, believe that the soul is pre-existing and enters the body at a particular stage of development.

In the time of Aristotle, it was widely believed that the human soul entered the forming body at 40 days (male embryos) or 90 days (female embryos), and quickening was an indication of the presence of a soul. Other religious views are that ensoulment happens at the moment of conception; or when the child takes the first breath after being born; at the formation of the nervous system and brain; at the first detectable sign of brain activity; or when the fetus is able to survive independently of the uterus (viability).

The concept is closely related to debates on the morality of abortion as well as the morality of contraception. Religious beliefs that human life has an innate sacredness to it have motivated many statements by spiritual leaders of various traditions over the years; however, the three matters are not exactly parallel, given that various figures have argued that some kind of life without a soul, in various contexts, still has a moral worth that must be considered.

== Ancient Greeks ==
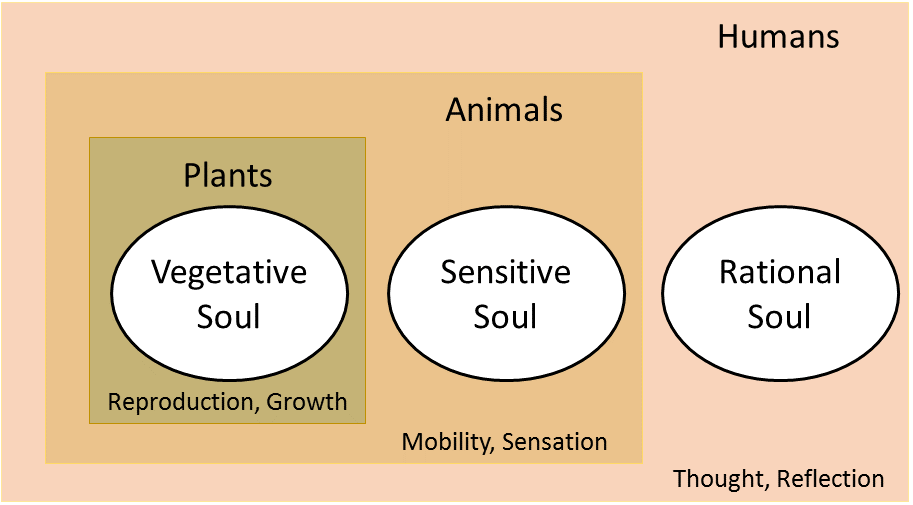
Aristotelian Soul

Among Greek scholars, Hippocrates (c.460 – c.370 BC) believed that the embryo was the product of male semen and a female factor. But Aristotle (384 – 322 BC) held that only male semen gave rise to an embryo, while the female only provided a place for the embryo to develop, (a concept he acquired from the preformationist Pythagoras). Aristotle believed a fetus in early gestation has the soul of a vegetable, then of an animal, and only later became "animated" with a human soul by "ensoulment". For him, ensoulment occurred 40 days after conception for male fetuses and 90 days after conception for female fetuses, the stage at which, it was held, movement is first felt within the womb and pregnancy was certain. This is called epigenesis, which is "the theory that the germ is brought into existence (by successive accretions), and not merely developed, in the process of reproduction", in contrast to the theory of preformation, which asserts the "supposed existence of all the parts of an organism in rudimentary form in the egg or the seed;" modern embryology, which finds both that an organism begins with an inherited genetic code and that embryonic stem cells can develop epigenetically into a variety of cell types, may be seen as supporting a balance between the views.

Stoicism maintained that the living animal soul was received only at birth, through contact with the outer air, and was transformed into a rational soul only at fourteen years of age. Epicureanism saw the origin of the soul (considered to consist of only a small number of atoms even in adults) as simultaneous with conception. Pythagoreanism also considered ensoulment to occur at conception.

== Christianity ==
=== Historical development ===
From the 12th century, when the West first came to know more of Aristotle than his works on logic, medieval declarations by Popes and theologians on ensoulment were based on the Aristotelian hypothesis. Aristotle's epigenetic view of successive life principles ("souls") in a developing human embryo—first a vegetative and then a sensitive or animal soul, and finally an intellective or human soul, with the higher levels able to carry out the functions also of the lower levels—was the prevailing view among early Christians, including Tertullian, Augustine, and Jerome. Lars Østnor says this view was only "presaged" by Augustine, who belongs to a period later than that of early Christianity. According to David Albert Jones, this distinction appeared among Christian writers only in the late fourth and early fifth century, while the earlier writers made no distinction between formed and unformed, a distinction that Saint Basil of Caesarea explicitly rejected. While the Hebrew text of the Bible only required a fine for the loss of a fœtus, whatever its stage of development, the Greek Septuagint (LXX) translation of the Hebrew text, a pre-Christian translation that the early Christians used, introduced a distinction between a formed and an unformed fœtus and treated destruction of the former as murder. It has been commented that "the LXX could easily have been used to distinguish human from non-human fœtuses and homicidal from non-homicidal abortions, yet the early Christians, until the time of Augustine in the fifth century, did not do so."

The view of early Christians on the moment of ensoulment is also said to have been not the Aristotelian, but the Pythagorean:

As early as the time of Tertullian in the third century, Christianity had absorbed the Pythagorean Greek view that the soul was infused at the moment of conception. Though this view was confirmed by St. Gregory of Nyssa a century later, it would not be long before it would be rejected in favour of the Septuagintal notion that only a formed fœtus possessed a human soul. While Augustine speculated whether "animation" might be present prior to formation, he determined that abortion could only be defined as homicide once formation had occurred. Nevertheless, in common with all early Christian thought, Augustine condemned abortion from conception onward.

St. Maximus the Confessor in his repudiation of the Origenist pre-existence theory outlines in his Ambigua a deductive position that both refutes the pre-existence and delayed ensoulment theories of his day. The general premise for his arguments is priority of 'coming-to-being' to 'being-in-motion'. "All motion, in other words, unfolds in simple and composite patterns. If, then, coming into being must necessarily' be posited before beings can begin to move, it follows that motion is subsequent to the manifestation of being." Further, in arguing that body and soul are a substantial unity, he thereby reasons against delayed-ensoulment, "Therefore, insofar as soul and body are parts of man, it is not possible for either the soul or the body to exist before the other, or indeed to exist after the other in time, otherwise what is known as the principal of reciprocal relation would be destroyed." St. Maximus, in Ambiguum 42 elaborates the arguments against the pre-existence and delay-ensoulment in further detail as three separate digressions. In the first he argues against the pre-existence of the soul. Whatever is already a complete individual substance cannot enter into composition with another to form a new substantial whole without undergoing corruption. The pre-existent soul is posited to be a complete individual substance before union with the body. Therefore, according to the saint, the pre-existent soul cannot be united with the body to form a new human substance without undergoing corruption, which is absurd. Further does he argue that a natural substantial whole must originate from the simultaneous generation of its essential parts as he raised prior in Ambiguum 7, upon this, that man in particular is a natural substantial whole composed of soul and body. Ultimately, leading St. Maximus to conclude that man must originate from the simultaneous generation of both soul and body. In the second digression St. Maximus argues for the position that the human soul cannot develop from a pre-existing kind of soul after ensoulment. First he argues for ensoulment. The argument runs in the beginning with the premise that a thing is completely devoid of soul is dead and incapable of vital activity. But, he contends, the embryo exhibits vital activity (growth, nourishment, organic development). Therefore, the embryo is not devoid of soul. And thus consequently he goes on to make the case that unless the embryo has a rational soul from the beginning, man would not beget man. The third and last digression specifically repudiates delayed ensoulment. His arguments here are primarily theological, having in the prior digression furnished the natural argumentation that serves as its basis. First he presents the point that the kind of soul which bears the image of God must be rational and intellectual from its beginning. But man is created in the image of God and is so from the moment of conception. Therefore, St. Maximus concludes that man must have a rational and intellectual soul from the moment of conception. Further, he argues from the nature of medicine of his time:

This is proven by the method used to heal those parts of the body that have been wounded. For should physicians, in treating such wounds, find any areas that have suffered necrosis, they remove them by means of drugs that consume dead tissue, after which they apply what is necessary for the regeneration and restoration of the wounded area, since the living body possesses a nature capable o f regenerating itself, along with the capacity to restore and stabilize its proper state, whereas a dead body is incapable of doing any such thing, for once it is dead it completely loses its vital power, and for this reason is devoid of activity. How then can the body, which by nature easily dissipates and dissolves, stand on its own if it lacks the foundation, as it were, of a logically prior underlying life-giving power, which will naturally unite and hold its dissipative nature together, and from which it acquires its being and form, thanks to that power that has wisely fashioned all things by its art? For by virtue of whatever thing truly remains with the body after birth, one could rightly say that in that same thing there unquestionably resides the beginning of the body's existence. And with respect to any kind of body that by nature is dissolved upon its separation from this element, it is obvious that this very same thing coexisted with that body when it first came into being.

In the Medieval period, although also keeping open the possibility of delayed-ensoulment, this opinion of St. Maximus the Confessor was followed by St. Bonaventure in the second book of the Commentary on the Sentences of Peter Lombard (II Sent., d. 17, a. 1, q. 3) upon arguments from both reason and from Scripture prooftexts:

It seems by far more reasonable to posit, that the soul was produced immediately with the body, both because the soul is united to the body as (its) natural perfection, to which it naturally desires to be joined, to such an extent, that it is a punishment for it to be without it and to be sequestered from it; and also, because it is united (to it) as a mover to a movable, such that without the latter it cannot merit nor demerit; and for that reason it ought not have been produced before the body, lest it be punished before (Adam's) fault, and lest it merit and/or demerit apart from the body. — Moreover not only does reason concord with this position, nay also the authority of Scripture supports (it), which says, that after the production and formation of man (Genesis 2:7) God breathed into him the breath of life.

Through the Latin translations of Averroes's (1126–1198) work, beginning in the 12th century, the legacy of Aristotle was recovered in the West. Christian philosophers such as Thomas Aquinas (1224–1274) adapted largely to his views and because they believed that the early embryo did not have a human soul, they did not necessarily see early abortion as murder, although they condemned it nonetheless. Aquinas, in his main work, the Summa Theologica, states (Part I, question 118, article 2 ad 2)"...that the intellectual soul is created by God at the end of human generation". Although Jesus may have been exceptional, Aquinas did believe that the embryo first possessed a vegetative soul, later acquired sensitive (animal) soul, and after 40 days of development, God gave humans a rational soul.

In 1588, Pope Sixtus V issued the Bull Effraenatam, which subjected those that carried out abortions at any stage of gestation with automatic excommunication and the punishment by civil authorities applied to murderers. Three years later after finding that the results had not been as positive as was hoped, his successor Pope Gregory XIV limited the excommunication to abortion of a formed fœtus. In 1679, Pope Innocent XI publicly condemned sixty-five propositions taken chiefly from the writings of Escobar, Hereau and other casuists (mostly Jesuit casuists who had been heavily attacked by Pascal in his Provincial Letters) as propositiones laxorum moralistarum (propositions of lax moralists) as "at least scandalous and in practice dangerous". He forbade anyone to teach them under penalty of excommunication. The condemned propositions included:

34. It is lawful to procure abortion before ensoulment of the fetus lest a girl, detected as pregnant, be killed or defamed.

35. It seems probable that the fetus (as long as it is in the uterus) lacks a rational soul and begins to first have one when it is born and consequently it must be said that no abortion is homicide.

In the 1869 Bull Apostolicae Sedis, Pius IX rescinded Gregory XIV's not-yet-animated fetus exception and re-enacted the penalty of excommunication for abortions at any stage of pregnancy, which even before that were never seen as merely venial sin. Since then, canon law makes no distinction as regards excommunication between stages of pregnancy at which abortion is performed. In spite of the difference in ecclesiastical penalties imposed during the period when the theory of delayed ensoulment was accepted as scientific truth, abortion at any stage is currently claimed to have always been condemned by the Church and continues to be so. However, in its official declarations, the Catholic Church avoids taking a philosophical position on the question of the moment when a human person begins to be:

This Congregation is aware of the current debates concerning the beginning of human life, concerning the individuality of the human being and concerning the identity of the human person. The Congregation recalls the teachings found in the Declaration on Procured Abortion: "From the time that the ovum is fertilized, a new life is begun which is neither that of the father nor of the mother; it is rather the life of a new human being with his own growth. It would never be made human if it were not human already. To this perpetual evidence ... modern genetic science brings valuable confirmation. It has demonstrated that, from the first instant, the programme is fixed as to what this living being will be: a man, this individual-man with his characteristic aspects already well determined. Right from fertilization is begun the adventure of a human life, and each of its great capacities requires time ... to find its place and to be in a position to act". This teaching remains valid and is further confirmed, if confirmation were needed, by recent findings of human biological science which recognize that in the zygote resulting from fertilization the biological identity of a new human individual is already constituted. Certainly no experimental datum can be in itself sufficient to bring us to the recognition of a spiritual soul; nevertheless, the conclusions of science regarding the human embryo provide a valuable indication for discerning by the use of reason a personal presence at the moment of this first appearance of a human life: how could a human individual not be a human person? The Magisterium has not expressly committed itself to an affirmation of a philosophical nature, but it constantly reaffirms the moral condemnation of any kind of procured abortion. This teaching has not been changed and is unchangeable.

Citing the possibly first-century Didache and the Letter of Barnabas of about the same period, the Epistle to Diognetus and Tertullian, the Catholic Church declares that "since the first century the Church has affirmed the moral evil of every procured abortion. This teaching has not changed and remains unchangeable. Direct abortion, that is to say, abortion willed either as an end or a means, is gravely contrary to the moral law." Even when the prevailing scientific theory considered that early abortion was the killing of what was not yet a human being, the condemnation of abortion at any stage was sometimes expressed in the form of making it equivalent to homicide. Accordingly, the 1907 article on abortion in the Catholic Encyclopedia stated:

The early Christians are the first on record as having pronounced abortion to be the murder of human beings, for their public apologists, Athenagoras, Tertullian, and Minutius Felix (Eschbach, "Disp. Phys.", Disp. iii), to refute the slander that a child was slain, and its flesh eaten, by the guests at the Agapæ, appealed to their laws as forbidding all manner of murder, even that of children in the womb. The Fathers of the Church unanimously maintained the same doctrine. In the fourth century the Council of Eliberis decreed that Holy Communion should be refused all the rest of her life, even on her deathbed, to an adulteress who had procured the abortion of her child. The Sixth Ecumenical Council determined for the whole Church that anyone who procured abortion should bear all the punishments inflicted on murderers. In all these teachings and enactments no distinction is made between the earlier and the later stages of gestation. For, though the opinion of Aristotle, or similar speculations, regarding the time when the rational soul is infused into the embryo, were practically accepted for many centuries still it was always held by the Church that he who destroyed what was to be a man was guilty of destroying a human life.

The Catechism of the Catholic Church states that Human life "must be treated from conception as a person." In 2008, this teaching was confirmed in the authoritative Instruction Dignitas Personae, stating "The dignity of a person must be recognized in every human being from conception to natural death." It stated that "Although the presence of the spiritual soul cannot be observed experimentally, the conclusions of science regarding the human embryo give "a valuable indication for discerning by the use of reason a personal presence at the moment of the first appearance of a human life: how could a human individual not be a human person?"

=== Catholicism ===
On 27 November 2010, Pope Benedict XVI stated:

[F]rom the moment of its conception life must be guarded with the greatest care. ... With regard to the embryo in the mother's womb, science itself highlights its autonomy, its capacity for interaction with the mother, the coordination of biological processes, the continuity of development, the growing complexity of the organism. It is not an accumulation of biological material but rather of a new living being, dynamic and marvelously ordered, a new individual of the human species. This is what Jesus was in Mary's womb; this is what we all were in our mother's womb.

The most recent source on ensoulment is the 2008 Instruction Dignitas Personae, which confirmed that the human being is a human person from their conception, and that there is no compelling philosophical argument to deny ensoulment from conception.

In relation to elective abortion, Pope John Paul II wrote about ensoulment in his 1995 encyclical letter Evangelium Vitae:

Throughout Christianity's two thousand year history, this same doctrine of condemning all direct abortions has been constantly taught by the Fathers of the Church and by her Pastors and Doctors. Even scientific and philosophical discussions about the precise moment of the infusion of the spiritual soul have never given rise to any hesitation about the moral condemnation of abortion.

While the Church has always condemned abortion, changing beliefs about the moment the embryo gains a human soul have led their stated reasons for such condemnation and the classification of abortion within canon law codes to change over time.

=== Southern Baptists ===
The Southern Baptist Convention teaches that ensoulment occurs at conception. Resolution 7, which was adopted by the Southern Baptist Convention in 1999, declared that "The Bible teaches that human beings are made in the image and likeness of God (Genesis 1:27, 9:6) and protectable human life begins at fertilization."

=== Eastern Orthodoxy ===
The Orthodox Church while not having dogmatised either Traducianism or Creationism (of the soul), follows the Church Fathers who, either Traducianist or Creationist, believe that the embryo possesses a soul from conception. For example, they accept the Trullo canons, which contain the canons of Basil of Caesarea, which state that the canonical punishment for abortion is the same as for murder, regardless of the development of the embryo (Basil's Canon 2). See also Basil's letter to Amphilochius of Iconium.

== Judaism ==
Jewish views on ensoulment have varied. Rabbi David Feldman states that the Talmud discusses the time of ensoulment, but considers the question unanswerable and irrelevant to the abortion question. In recounting a purported conversation in which the rabbi Judah the Prince, who said the soul (neshama) comes into the body when the embryo is already formed, was convinced by Antoninus Pius that it must enter the body at conception, and considered the emperor's view to be supported by Job 10:12, the tractate Sanhedrin of the Talmud mentions two views on the question. In a variant reading the rabbi's first statement was that the soul entered the body only at birth.

Other passages in the Talmud, such as Yevamot 69a and Nidda 30b have been interpreted as implying that ensoulment may occur only after forty days of gestation. The Talmud passages, whether speaking of ensoulment at conception or only after forty days, place the views of the rabbis within Greco-Roman culture, whose ideas the rabbis then linked with texts of Scripture and endowed with theological significance. The view of ensoulment at conception harmonizes with general lore among rabbis about conscious activity before birth. However, most of them did not apply the word nefesh, meaning soul or person, to a fetus still in the womb. The latter half of the Second Temple period saw increasing acceptance of the idea of the soul as joining the body at birth and leaving it again at death. One Jewish view put ensoulment even later than birth, saying that it occurs when the child first answers "Amen". The rabbis in fact formulated no fully developed theory of the timing or nature of ensoulment. It has been suggested that the reason why they were not more concerned about the exact moment of ensoulment is that Judaism does not believe in strict separation of soul and body.

== Islam ==
There are four Sunni Islam schools of thought — Hanafi, Shafi'i, Hanbali and Maliki — and they have their own views on ensoulment, with differing implications. Two passages in the Qur'an describe the fetal development process:

We created man from an essence of clay, then We placed him as a drop of fluid (nutfah) in a safe place, then We made that drop into a clinging form (alaqah), and We made that form into a lump of flesh (mudghah), and We made that lump into bones (idhaam), and We clothed those bones with flesh (lahm), and later We made him into other forms—glory be to God, the best of creators! (23:12–14)

...We created you from dust, then from a drop of fluid (nutfah), then a clinging form ('alaqah), then a lump of flesh (mudghah), both shaped and unshaped: We mean to make Our power clear to you. Whatever We choose We cause to remain in the womb for an appointed time, then We bring you forth as infants and then you grow and reach maturity. ... (22:5)

The Maliki madhhab holds "that the fetus is ensouled at the moment of conception" and thus "most Malikis do not permit abortion at any point, seeing God's hand as actively forming the fetus at every stage of development." In this view,

The generally accepted belief is that abortion is forbidden at any stage of a pregnancy on the basis of the following verses from the Qur'an.

"...And do not kill the soul which God has forbidden except for the requirements of justice..." [Glorious Qur'an, Al- An'am 8: 151].

Thus, the termination of a pregnancy, even at the earliest possible stage, without medical justification is not allowed (even for social or economic reasons), as stated in the Glorious Qur'an:

"...do not Kill your children for fear of want: We shall provide sustenance for them as well as for you. Verily the killing of them is a great sin." [Glorious Qur'an, Al- Esraa' 17: 31].

The Hanafi madhab places the point of ensoulment at 120 days after conception and a minority opinion teaches that it occurs at 40 days. In the latter view, abortion after 40 or 120 days is considered to be a greater sin.

"Verily, the creation of one of you is brought together in the mother's womb for forty days in the form of a drop (nutfah), then he becomes a clot ('alaqah) for a like period, then a lump for a like period, then there is sent an angel who blows the soul into him."

— Hadith #4, Imam al-Nawawī's Forty Hadith, Ibn Hajar al-Haytamī, al-Fath al-mubīn bi sharh al-arba'īn

Most schools of thought, traditional and modern, make allowances for circumstances threatening the health or life of the mother. In 2003, Shia scholars in Iran approved therapeutic abortion before 16 weeks of gestation under limited circumstances, including medical conditions related to fetal and maternal health.

== Hinduism ==
Some Hindus believe that personhood begins with the reincarnation that happens at conception. But many scriptural references such as the Charaka Samhita, Ayurveda's most authoritative treatise on perfect health and longevity, states the soul does not become attached to the body until the 7th month "the occupant doesn't move into the house until the house is finished", certainly not in the first trimester. The physical body is a biological growth undergoing constant reflexive testing and trial runs as it grows into a physiology capable of housing human consciousness. But the flexibility of Hinduism allows for destruction of embryos to save a human life, or embryonic stem cell research to benefit humankind using surplus blastocysts from fertility clinics.

== Jainism ==
Although beliefs vary for different individuals, some followers of Jainism hold the belief that souls (called jivas) or life exist in sperm prior to conception, thus practicing celibacy or abstinence from sex can be done as a way to avoid releasing and killing sperm cells in order to follow Ahimsa (non-violence). This practice is unrelated to the broader practice of celibacy in Jainism called Brahmacharya.

== Bahá'í Faith ==
In a letter written on behalf of Shoghi Effendi dated October 9, 1947 (Lights of Guidance # 1699), it is stated: "The soul or spirit of the individual comes into being with the conception of his physical body."

== Identical twins ==
Examining questions of ensoulment of identical (monozygotic) twins gives rise to certain complexities.

Richard Charles Playford of Institute of Theology, St Mary's University, London, notes that "Many contemporary Aristotelians believe that a human being is present [in the mother's reproductive system] from the moment of conception. At the same time, certain findings in modern embryology about the formation of identical twins challenge this belief."

A letter by Edwin Carlyle "Carl" Wood, published in 1982 states, in part: "The early embryo (up to eight cells) does have genetic individuality, but a multicellular individual is still not present. Two early embryos can be fused into one and one early embryo can divide into twins. Each cell behaves as if it is significantly independent of the other cells. Since persons, as usually defined, are multicellular individuals, it is difficult to maintain scientifically that a person has come into existence before the eight-cell stage. At least in a developmental sense, the early embryo is pre-individual."

Norman Michael Ford was President of the Melbourne College of Divinity, Melbourne, Australia in 1991-1992. He wrote the book When Did I Begin? Conception of the human individual in history, philosophy and science (1988). The book investigates the theoretical, moral, and biological issues surrounding the debate over the beginning of human life. Following a detailed analysis of the history of the question, Reverend Ford argues that a human individual could not begin before definitive individuation about two weeks after fertilization. This, he argues, is when it becomes finally known whether one or more human individuals are to form from a single egg. Thus, he questions the idea that the fertilized egg itself could be regarded as the beginning of the development of the human individual. Ford also differs sharply, however, from those who would delay the beginning of the human person until the brain is formed, or until birth or the onset of conscious states.

David W. Shoemaker says "Consider, for example, what happens at around five days after fertilization, when certain cells separate off from the ICM (the embryo's inner cell mass) to form the trophectoderm. The entire collection, including the outer layer, still falls under the rubric of 'embryo'…but it is only the cells of the ICM whose descendants will form a fetus and then an infant. Are the cells of the trophectoderm, which are synchronically unified with the cells of the ICM at this time as an embryo, also unified as part of a single human being via the soul? ... If not, then the ontological object to be ensouled is not the embryo but the ICM. But the ICM does not come into existence until around five days post-conception."

== See also ==
- Beginning of human personhood
