= Near-birth experience =

Alleged recollected event which occurred before or during one's own birth

A near-birth experience (also known as a pre-birth experience or pre-mortal experience) is an alleged recollected event which occurred before or during one's own birth, or during the pregnancy, an alleged remembering of one's own pre-existence, or an alleged encounter with the unborn child (usually via dream) experienced by relatives or close family friends. Under this usage, the term "near-birth experience" is analogous to the term "near-death experience."

== History ==
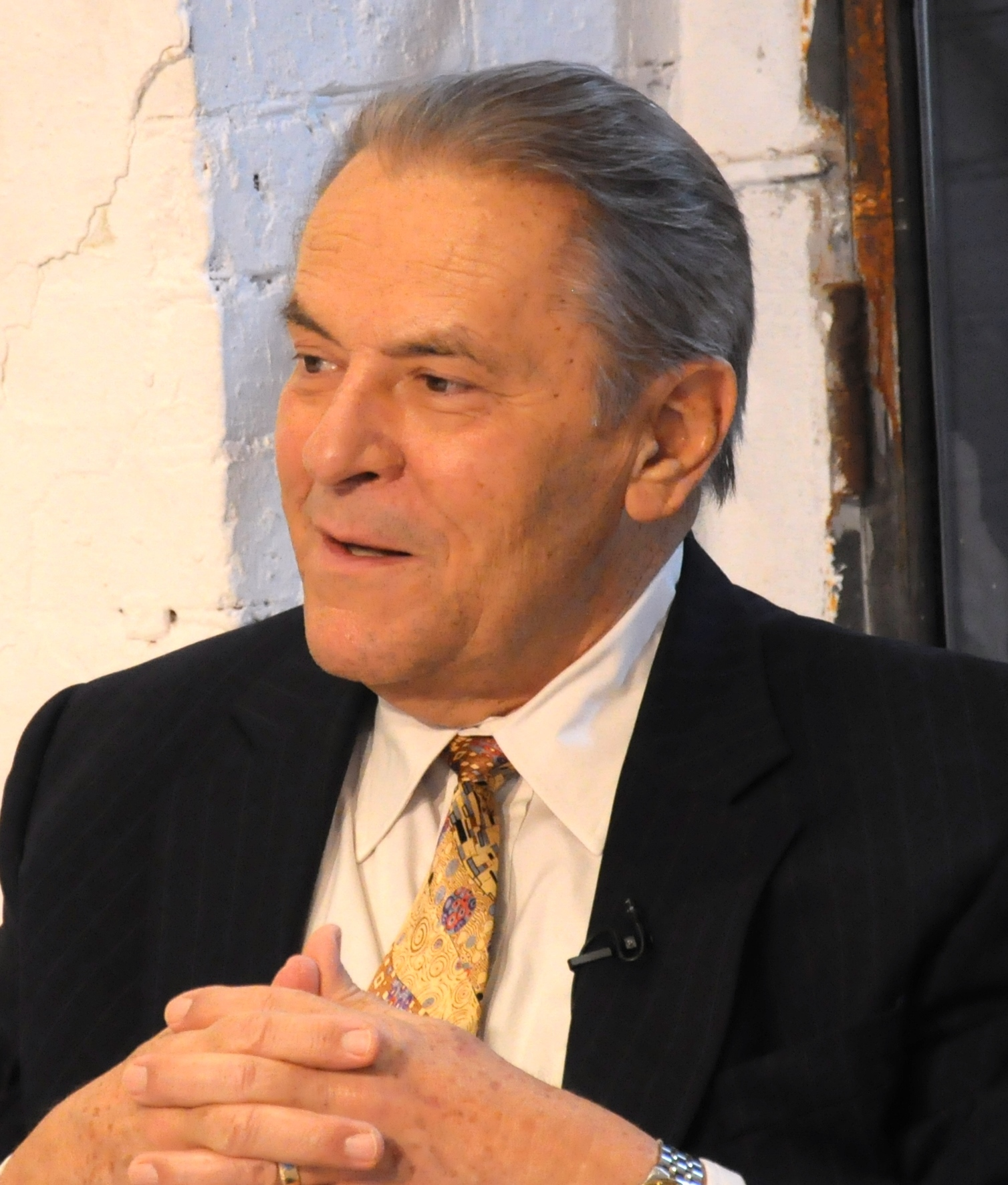
Stanislav Grof has written on the near-birth experience.

Psychiatrist Stanislav Grof, in 1954 researched LSD in Prague, and after 1967, he explored ketamine, and other methods for exhibiting non-ordinary states of consciousness like holotropic breathing. Grof concluded that some near-death experiences (NDEs) are virtual recollection of birth memories, actual re-experiencing of parts of the process in symbolic form, and "movement towards the light tunnel being a memory or symbolic re-experience of being born: a memory of the 'near-birth experience'." According to Grof, the NDE reflects memories of the birth process with the tunnel representing the birth canal.

In 1979, science writer Carl Sagan also supported the hypothesis that near-death experiences are memories of birth. The parapsychologist Barbara Honegger (1983) wrote that the out-of-body experience (OBE) may be based on a rebirth fantasy or reliving of the birth process based on reports of tunnel-like passageways and a cord-like connection by some OBErs which she compared to an umbilical cord. The hypothesis was refuted in a statistical study by Susan Blackmore.

== Criticism ==
Psychologist Chris French has written that "the experience of being born is only very superficially similar to the NDE" and the hypothesis has been refuted as it is common for those born by caesarean section to experience a tunnel during the NDE.

Psychologist and skeptic Susan Blackmore has claimed that the near-birth experience hypothesis is "pitifully inadequate to explain the NDE. For a start the newborn infant would not see anything like a tunnel as it was being born."

Notable skeptic Michael Shermer has also criticized the hypothesis and concluded that "there is no evidence for infantile memories of any kind. Furthermore, the birth canal does not look like a tunnel and besides the infant's head is normally down and its eyes are closed."

== See also ==
- Past life regression
