= Creationism (soul) =

Christian belief that God creates a soul for each human

Creationism (or historically creatianism) is a doctrine held by some Christians that God creates a soul for each body that is generated. Alternative Christian views on the origin of souls are traducianism and also the idea of a pre-existence of the soul. The Scholastic philosophers held the theory of Creationism.

== Concept ==
Creationism holds that the origin of the soul cannot be by spiritual generation from the souls of parents (as the German theologian Jakob Frohschammer (1821-1893) maintained) because human souls, being essentially and integrally simple and indivisible, can give forth no spiritual germs or reproductive elements. The creation of the soul by the First Cause, when second causes have posited the pertinent conditions, falls within the order of nature; it is a so-called "law of nature", not an interference therewith.

As regards the time when the individual soul is created, philosophical speculation varies. The traditional philosophy of the Roman Catholic Church holds that the rational soul is created at the moment when it is infused into the new person. Thomas Aquinas, following Aristotle's embryology, taught that rational soul is created when the antecedent principles of life have rendered the foetus an appropriate organism for rational life, though some time is required after birth before the sensory organs are sufficiently developed to assist in the functions of intelligence. On the other hand, most neo-Scholastics hold that the rational soul is created and infused into the human being at the moment of conception.

== History ==
Augustine of Hippo was undecided between creationism and traducianism, while Jerome condemned traducianism and held that creationism was the opinion of the Church. Augustine attempted to reconcile the statement in Genesis 2:2 "On the seventh day God completed the work he had been doing; he rested on the seventh day from all the work he had undertaken," with Jerome's citation of John 5:17, ""My Father is at work until now, so I am at work,"

if, I say, … we affirm that for each individual He creates separately a new soul when he is born, we do not herein affirm that He makes anything which he had not already made. For He had already made man after His own image on the sixth day; and this work of His is unquestionably to be understood with reference to the rational soul of man. The same work He still does, not in creating what did not exist, but in multiplying what already existed. Wherefore it is true, on the one hand, that He rested from creating things which previously did not exist, and equally true, on the other hand, that He continues still to work, not only in governing what He has made, but also in making (not anything which did not previously exist, but) a larger number of those creatures which He had already made. Wherefore, either by such an explanation, or by any other which may seem better, we escape from the objection advanced by those who would make the fact that God rested from His works a conclusive argument against our believing that new souls are still being daily created, not from the first soul, but in the same manner as it was made.

Philo and some rabbis insisted that God’s providence remains active, keeping all things in existence, giving life in birth and taking it away in death. Other rabbis taught that God rested from creating, but not from judging, ruling, or governing.

Creationism, which had always prevailed in Eastern Christianity, became the general opinion of the medieval theologians. Amongst the Scholastics there were no defenders of Traducianism. Hugh of Saint Victor and Alexander of Hales alone characterize Creationism as the more probable opinion; all the other Schoolmen hold it as certain. Peter Lombard's creando infundit animas Deus et infundendo creat ("in creating, God pours in the soul, and in pouring, He creates") was an accepted formula.

Martin Luther, like Augustine, was undecided, but Lutherans have as a rule been traducianists. John Calvin favoured creationism.

Gottfried Wilhelm Leibniz argued that Creationism guards the dignity and spirituality of the rational soul, and is the proper seat of the image of God. Hermann Lotze, however, who may be taken as representing the believers in the immanence of the divine Being, puts forth – but as a "dim conjecture" – something very like creationism.

This view is generally held by the contemporary magisterium of the Roman Catholic Church, most notably in the instruction Dignitas Personae. The Catechism of the Catholic Church, 366, states that "The Church teaches that every spiritual soul is created immediately by God— it is not 'produced' by the parents…."
