= Traducianism =

Christian belief about the origin of the soul

In Christian theology, Traducianism is a doctrine about the origin of the soul holding that this immaterial aspect is transmitted through natural generation along with the body, the material aspect of human beings. That is, human propagation is of the whole being, both material and immaterial aspects: an individual's soul is derived from the soul of one or both parents. This implies that only the soul of Adam was created directly by God (with Eve's substance, material and immaterial, being taken from out of Adam), in contrast with the idea of creationism of the soul, which holds that all souls are created directly by God.

== History ==
All Church Fathers agreed that the soul of Adam was directly created by God; they disagreed about whether humans thereafter were each given souls as a special act of creation, or whether souls were passed on to them the same way their bodies were. Tertullian actively advocated traducianism, the parental generation of souls. After the rise of Pelagianism, some theologians hesitated between traducianism and creationism, believing the former to offer a better, if not the only, explanation of the transmission of original sin. For Augustine, traducianism suggested a simple explanation for original sin, but he could not decide between it and creationism. In his writing to Saint Jerome, Augustine said, "If that opinion of the creation of new souls is not opposed to this established article of faith let it be also mine; if it is, let it not be thine." Jerome condemned it and said that creationism was the opinion of the Church, but he admitted that most of the Western Christians held traducianism. Gregory of Nyssa alone among the Greek Fathers leaned toward traducianism. Theodore Abu Qurrah, Macarius, Rufinus and Nemesius also favored that view. Clement of Alexandria laid the foundations for the creationist view. Ambrose of Milan drew a distinction between the creation of Eve's body from Adam's rib and the creation of her soul by citing Genesis 2:22: "the man said: "This one, at last, is bone of my bones and flesh of my flesh." He noted that it did not say "soul of my soul", but that can only mean that the souls of the first man and the first woman were both created separately and independently.

Creationism always prevailed in the East and became the general opinion of medieval theologians. Amongst the Scholastics, there were no defenders of traducianism. Alexander of Hales characterized creationism as the more probable opinion. All the other scholastics held creationism as certain and differed only in regard to the censure that should be attached to the opposite error. Accordingly, Peter Lombard asserted, "The Catholic Church teaches that souls are created at their infusion into the body." Saint Thomas Aquinas was more emphatic: "It is heretical to say that the intellectual soul is transmitted by process of generation." Hugh of Saint Victor and Hilary of Poitiers were creationists. Anselm of Canterbury was against traducianism.

There was a diversity of opinions among the remaining scholastics. Some held that the soul of a child is produced by the soul of the parents just as the body is generated by the parent body. Others maintained that all souls are created apart and are then united with their respective bodies, either by their own volition or by the command and action of God. Still others declared that the soul in the moment of its creation is infused into the body. Although for a time, the several views were upheld, and it was doubtful which came nearest the truth, the Church subsequently condemned the first two and approved the third. Gregory of Valencia spoke of "Generationism" as "certainly erroneous." Although there are no explicit definitions authoritatively put forth by the Catholic Church that would warrant calling Creationism to be de fide doctrine, there can be no doubt as to which view has been favored by ecclesiastical authority.

That the soul sinned in its pre-existent state and on that account was incarcerated in the body is regarded by the Catholic Church as a fiction that has been repeatedly condemned. Divested of that fiction, the theory that the soul exists prior to its infusion into the organism, while not explicitly reprobated, is obviously opposed to the doctrine of the Catholic Church according to which souls are multiplied correspondingly with the multiplication of human organisms. However, whether the rational soul is infused into the organism at conception, as the modern opinion holds, or some weeks subsequently, as medieval scholastics supposed, is an open question to some theologians.

Martin Luther, like Augustine, was unwilling to make a dogmatic statement but at least later in his life moved away from the medieval consensus and favored the Traducian position. In the theses Luther prepared for Peter Hegemon's doctoral disputation in 1545 concerning the origin of souls, Luther argues for the view that the soul of the child is generated from the souls of the parents in a way that is analogous to the generation of the body from the parents, believing this to be more consistent with the Biblical testimony than an immediate direct creation of each individual soul by God. The Lutheran dogmatic tradition that followed was decidedly traducian, with Johann Gerhard, David Hollatz, Johannes Andreas Quenstedt all clearly articulating traducianism. John Calvin favoured creationism, as did Robert Baron. The Catholic Church postulates that the souls are created immediately at the moment of the conception. Pope Pius XII stated: "That the souls are created by God, it is the Catholic Faith that obliges us to accept."

== Supporters ==
Traducianism was developed initially by Tertullian, who took a semi-materialistic view of the nature of the soul. It has been endorsed by Church Fathers such as Saint Gregory of Nyssa, Saint Anastasius Sinaita, and other theological figures in the early centuries of Christianity. Protestant advocates include various Lutheran Churches as well as some modern theologians such as Augustus H. Strong (Baptist), and Gordon Clark (Presbyterian), Lewis Sperry Chafer, Millard Erickson, Norman L. Geisler, and Robert L. Reymond.

W. G. T. Shedd says that the soul of any given individual is a part of the original soul given to Adam, and therefore is not originated in the act of procreation.

In Evil, Sin and Christian Theism (2022), Andrew Loke argues for a modified hylomorphic theory that combines the merits of both Traducianism and Creationism. According to this view, a unique soul is generated when the gametes of parents that carry soulish potentialities meet (Traducian account), but it is God who gives a unique shape to the soul (Creationist account). Thus, while the "soul-stuffs" are ancestrally passed on, the soul-shape is divinely caused.

== Arguments in opposition ==
Reasons for opposing traducianism include the metaphysical argument that since humans cannot control their own existence, their existence cannot be caused by themselves; it must rather be caused by a necessary being otherwise known as God. Creation, in other words, includes God's ongoing causation of human existence. This causation is through the human soul because, as Saint Thomas Aquinas argues, the human soul has activities beyond the capacity of matter and the existence of these activities shows that the human soul is both immaterial and immortal—but not independent of God's causality. The Roman Catholic Church teaches that "every spiritual soul is created immediately by God—it is not "produced" by the parents—and also that it is immortal" This argument, however, does not contradict the idea that souls can give existence to new souls the same way there is intentionality, action and causation in the material nature. Humans have, however, free will and thus control over their own existence, as much as they are responsible for the act of procreation. Traducianism contradicts the concept of the indivisibility of the soul, but this is a merging and creation of two souls. If the souls are incapable of division, then it is impossible for the soul of the child to be derived from the souls of the parents. But this is a merging and creation by two souls, and God would also have to divide himself in order to create a new one through his own substance. To God, nothing is impossible, as it is possible to God to create a new one from nothing perhaps from himself. Such is being divided from something, even two rather than one, both parents souls being that powerful. Also, in the Nicene Creed, the Son was generated, not created, and the Holy Ghost proceeds from the Father.

The weakness of traducianism, to many theologians, is that it makes the generation of the soul dependent as it is parallel to of the transmission of matter. Presbyterian theologian Charles Hodge held that since the nature of the soul is immaterial it could not be transmitted by natural generation. To others, however, it is not a weakness of argument, since to God that is not impossible, spirit is unlike matter, not being the same process, and since any way of existence of soul is as good as any other, and since for every human body there is a soul, regardless of how and what made it come into existence, and that soul comes in to existence because there is a transmission of matter to create a human being, there is not any issue about God making his generation of the soul dependent of the transmission of matter.

Yet another argument for opposing traducianism is from the accounts of creation in Genesis. If it took divine action to create human beings in the beginning, it takes divine action now because neither in the beginning nor in the present is it possible for mortal beings to make immortal souls. This argument, however, is not contradictory with the idea that, if the first souls had to be created by God, that was simply because they were the first, and it does not mean they cannot originate new ones on their own.

Traducianism proceeds on the unproven assumption that God only works in a managerial manner after completing the creation of the world, as creationism proceeds on the unproven opposite assumption. Louis Berkhof points out that God continues to work immediately both in the performance of miracles and in some parts of the work of redemption.

Some Reformed Protestants oppose traducianism by contending that it means that if the parents of the child are regenerate, then the soul of the child must also be regenerate, which obscures the doctrine of original sin as articulated by Augustinian theologians of the Calvinist tradition. This argument, however, is not contradictory to the idea that the parents are responsible for their own regeneration the same way their offspring is responsible for its own regeneration. It can also be argued that, if there is an original sin, newly created souls are bound to something that was not caused by anyone that has given origin to them, thus contradicting the same doctrine.

The Charismatic movement also generally supports the idea that the Holy Spirit is the Creator of every individual soul, citing the traditional hymn Veni Creator Spiritus as evidence that Christians have long invoked the divine soul-making properties of the spirit. John 5:17 states: "But Jesus answered them, "My Father is still working, so I am working, too," indicating that God is still at work giving life at the time Jesus' words are spoken. But working can simply have the meaning that God is simply working for the salvation of mankind. In its origin it was an allusion to the Jewish belief that God remained actively working in the universe even after its creation and does not necessarily mean soul creation or the creation of anything new.

== See also ==
- Christian anthropology
- Christian mortalism
- Dualism (philosophy of mind)
- Ensoulment

== Sources ==
- Traducianism by Gordon Clark, from the website of the Trinity Foundation
