= Abortion debate =

Debate on circumstances permitting abortion of fetus

The abortion debate is a longstanding and contentious discourse that touches on the moral, legal, medical, and religious aspects of induced abortion. In English-speaking countries, the debate has two major sides, commonly referred to as the "pro-choice" and "pro-life" movements. Generally, supporters of pro-choice argue for the right to choose to terminate a pregnancy. They take into account various factors such as the stage of fetal development, the health of the woman, and the circumstances of the conception. By comparison, the supporters of pro-life generally argue that a fetus is a human being with inherent rights and intrinsic value, and thus, cannot be overridden by the woman's choice or circumstances and that abortion is morally wrong in most or all cases. Both the terms pro-choice and pro-life are considered loaded words in mainstream media, which tend to prefer terms such as "abortion rights" or "anti-abortion" as more neutral and avoidant of bias.

Each movement has had varying results in influencing public opinion and attaining legal support for its position. Supporters and opponents of abortion often argue that it is essentially a moral issue, concerning the beginning of human personhood, rights of the fetus, and bodily integrity. Additionally, some argue that government involvement in abortion-related decisions, particularly through public funding, raises ethical and political questions. Libertarians, for example, may oppose taxpayer funding for abortion based on principles of limited government and personal responsibility, while holding diverse views on the legality of the procedure itself. The debate has become a political and legal issue in some countries with those who oppose abortion seeking to enact, maintain, and expand anti-abortion laws, while those who support abortion seek to repeal or ease such laws and expand access to the procedure. Abortion laws vary considerably between jurisdictions, ranging from outright prohibition of the procedure to public funding of abortion. The availability of abortion procedures considered safe also varies across the world and exists mainly in places that legalize abortion.

== Overview ==
In ancient times, issues such as abortion and infanticide were evaluated by patriarchies within the contexts of family planning, gender selection, population control, and property rights. The rights of the prospective mother and child were typically not central to these considerations. Ancient discourse often expressed the concerns on the nature of humankind, the existence of a soul, when life begins, and the beginning of human personhood, issues that are still relevant even today.

Discussion of the presumed personhood of a fetus may be complicated by the current legal status of children. Similar to minors, fetuses and embryos lack certain legal capacities. In many legal systems, a fetus or an embryo does not have the same legal status as a person. They have not reached the age of majority and deemed not able to enter into contracts and to sue or be sued. Since the 1860s, they have been treated as persons for the limited purposes of offence against the person law in the UK including Northern Ireland, although this treatment was amended by the Abortion Act of 1967 in England, Scotland, and Wales. In America, there have been logistical challenges in considering a fetus as a person. Some legal interpretations have argued that if a fetus is considered a person, then it is only under certain conditions as it relies on the body of another person and is usually not the object of direct action by another person. In the current debate, proposals range from prohibitions on abortion in all cases, even when the woman's life is at risk, to calls for complete legalization with provisions for public funding.

== Terminology ==
Many of the terms used in the debate are seen as political framing: terms used to validate one's stance while invalidating the opposition's. For example, the labels "pro-choice" and "pro-life" imply widely held values such as liberty or the right to life, while suggesting that the opposition must be "anti-choice" or "anti-life". Terms used in the debate to describe their opponents consist of "pro-abortion", "pro-abort"; however, these terms do not always reflect a political view or fall along a binary. Seven in ten Americans described themselves as "pro-choice" while almost two-thirds described themselves as "pro-life". Another identifier in the debate is "abolitionist", which harks back to the 19th-century struggle against human slavery.

Francis Beckwith argues that even seemingly neutral phrases like "abortion rights" are ideologically loaded. He contends that such language presupposes the moral legitimacy of abortion by framing it as a fundamental right, thereby sidestepping the underlying philosophical question of whether the unborn possess a right to life. In doing so, the term shapes public discourse by implicitly framing abortion access as presumptively justified.

Appeals are often made in the abortion debate to the rights of the fetus, pregnant woman, or other parties. Such appeals can generate confusion if the type of rights is not specified (whether civil, natural, or otherwise) or if it is simply assumed that the right appealed to takes precedence over all other competing rights (an example of begging the question). The appropriate terms to designate the human organism before birth are also debated. Some anti-abortion supporters regard the technical terminology "embryo" and "fetus" as dehumanizing, whereas some abortion rights proponents regard ordinary terms such as "baby" or "child" as emotion-inducing.

The use of the term "baby" to describe the unborn human organism is seen by some scholars as part of an effort to assign the organism agency, functioning to further the construction of fetal personhood. Anti-abortion activists occasionally use the term "the silent holocaust" or "the American genocide" about the number of abortions that have been performed in the United States since 1973.

== Political debate ==
There is abundant debate regarding the extent of abortion regulation by the government. Supporters of abortion rights may argue against the government regulation of abortions, and rather it be treated as routine medical practice. From a compromising perspective, both sides may support the permission of the government to prohibit elective abortions after the 20th week, viability, or the second trimester. Religion has also played a role in the debate. For example, some Christian denominations and groups generally oppose abortion, believing it more aligns with their interpretation of the Bible, and because of this may support the prohibition of some or all abortions, starting from conception. Those who oppose abortion rights may argue against the procedures and nature of abortion. The two sides of the political debate represent the contentious moral principles in the "sanctity of life" versus "the woman's right to choose." Abortion debates differ from other public health issues due to complex ethical and legal considerations.

In popular culture, the American romantic drama dance film Dirty Dancing (1987) is seen by The Hollywood Reporter as "a clear and unapologetic argument for reproductive choice".

== Worldwide stances ==
=== Countries that refuse abortions ===
Abortion and contraception were completely banned in Romania from 1967 to 1989, due to Decree 770 under Romanian dictator Nicolae Ceaușescu. As a result, maternal mortality in Romania became the highest in Europe, and thousands of children ended up in orphanages raised in grievous conditions, leading to a rise in child mortality.

As of 2016, six countries completely outlaw abortion: El Salvador, Malta, Vatican City, the Dominican Republic, Philippines, and Nicaragua. This prohibits a woman from having an abortion for any reason (underage, fetal impairment, rape/incest), even if it might mean saving her life. Penalties include jail time. For example, in El Salvador, abortions are punishable with up to 50 years in prison.

=== Countries with strict laws ===
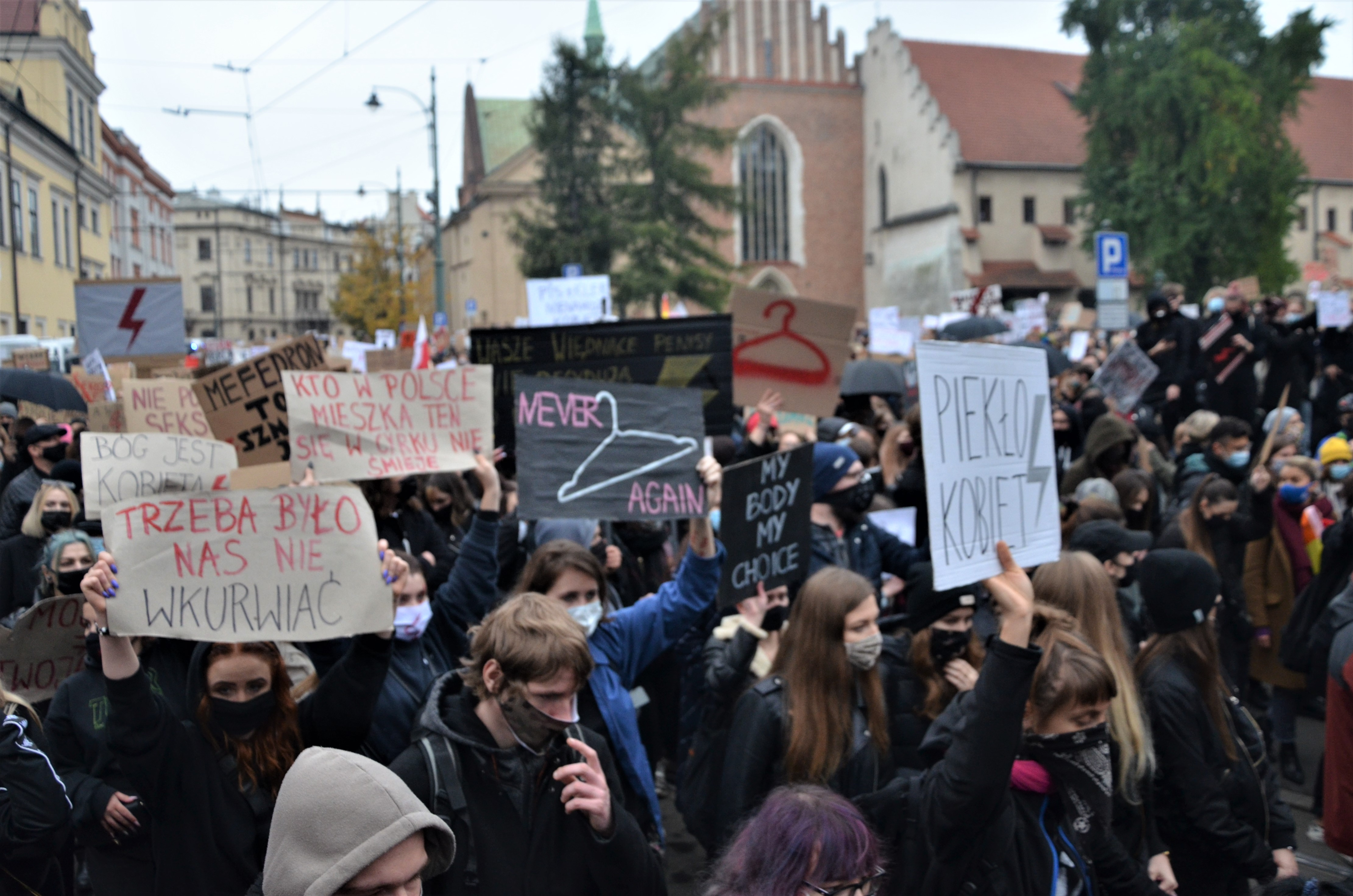
The October 2020 Polish protests were caused by severe changes to abortion laws.

Argentina allowed abortion only in case of rape or if the woman's health was at risk. In December 2020, the Argentine Senate passed a bill to legalize abortion. Also in 2020, the Constitutional Tribunal ended almost all legal abortion in Poland. China has a free abortion policy but some studies show that its government also uses forced abortion to enforce strict limits on how many children each family can have. In the United States, there are increasing efforts to limit access to abortion by states in the wake of the 2022 reversal of Roe v Wade (1973) which allowed for a constitutional right to abortion.

=== Effects of legalization/illegalization ===
Abortion rights advocates argue that outlawing abortion increases the rate of unsafe abortions, as the availability of professional abortion services decreases, and leads to increased maternal mortality. According to a global study collaboratively conducted by the World Health Organization and the Guttmacher Institute, most unsafe abortions occur where abortion is illegal. Withholding access to safe abortions results in 30,000 abortion-related deaths per year. Women may also choose suicide when abortion is illegal.

The effect on crime of legalized abortion is a subject of controversy, with proponents of the theory generally arguing that "unwanted children" are more likely to become criminals and that an inverse correlation is observed between the availability of abortion and subsequent crime.

Economist George Akerlof has argued that the legalization of abortion in the United States contributed to a declining sense of paternal duty among biological fathers and to a decline in shotgun weddings, even when women chose childbirth over abortion, and thus to an increase rather than a decrease in the rate of children born to unwed mothers.

KFF conducted a nationally representative survey of office-based OBGYNs in the U.S. Since Dobbs, 42% of OBGYNs report that they are very or somewhat concerned about their own legal risk when making decisions about patient care and abortion. This could greatly affect how many OBGYNs will continue to practice.

== Debates in North America ==
=== United States ===
==== The Dobbs decision ====
As an example of political decisions concerning the abortion debate, in the years following the Dobbs ruling, state governments have been granted political authority over abortion access and resources. The issue-framing and policy-making aspects vary from each perspective and interest but ultimately form the strategic decisions for legislators for support or opposition to their efforts.

The Dobbs decision allows other debates to form over several different concepts in other state legislature concerning the terms "privacy" and "liberty interests" which those cases have determined the foundation of clinician-patient relationships and private medical decisions. Abortion decisions bring focus onto other state efforts corresponding to abortion, such as limiting access to medication abortions, preventing third parties from assisting anyone seeking an abortion, or punishing women who get abortions. While evaluating the Dobbs ruling, the Court had determined the importance of the opposing factors of "respect for and preservation of prenatal life at all stages...; the protection of maternal health and safety; the elimination of particularly gruesome or barbaric medical procedures;... integrity of the medical profession; the mitigation of fetal pain, and the prevention of discrimination based on race, sex, or disability."

==== Privacy ====
In the United States, the debate has been framed as an aspect of privacy. Even though the right to privacy is not explicitly stated in many constitutions of sovereign nations, many people see it as foundational to a functioning democracy.

Time has stated that the issue of bodily privacy is "the core" of the abortion debate. Time defined privacy, concerning abortion, as the ability of a woman to "decide what happens to her own body". In political terms, privacy can be understood as a condition in which one is not observed or disturbed by government.

Traditionally, American courts have located the right to privacy in the Fourth Amendment, Ninth Amendment, Fourteenth Amendment, as well as the penumbra of the Bill of Rights. The landmark decision Roe v Wade relied on the 14th Amendment, which guarantees that federal rights shall be applied equally to all persons born in the United States. The 14th Amendment has given rise to the doctrine of Substantive due process, which is said to guarantee various privacy rights, including the right to bodily integrity.

While governments are allowed to invade the privacy of their citizens in some cases, they are expected to protect privacy in all cases lacking a compelling state interest. In the US, the compelling state interest test has been developed per the standards of strict scrutiny. In Roe v Wade, the Court decided that the state has an "important and legitimate interest in protecting the potentiality of human life" from the point of viability on, but that before viability, the woman's fundamental rights are more compelling than that of the state.

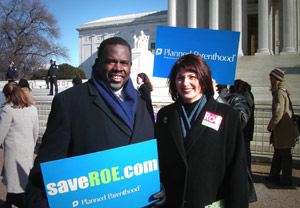
Albert Wynn and Gloria Feldt at the U.S. Supreme Court in Washington, D.C. to rally in support of Roe v. Wade

==== Aftermath of U.S. judicial involvement ====
Roe v. Wade struck down state laws banning abortion in 1973. Over 20 cases have addressed abortion law in the United States, all of which upheld Roe v. Wade. Since Roe, abortion has been legal throughout the country, but states have placed varying regulations on it, from requiring parental involvement in a minor's abortion to restricting late-term abortions.

After the court ruling, controversies continued, sometimes passionately. Judith Blake, for example, even before the ruling, predicted a backlash in attitudes about abortion in "Abortion and Public Opinion" (1971). After the ruling, her research indicated a considerable discrepancy between the views of the Court and those of the public at large. Meanwhile, philosophers and theologians (including Roger Wertheimer and Edmund Pincoffs) debated questions such as whether there is any rational basis for deciding whether a zygote, embryo, or fetus must be considered to be a human being.

Legal criticisms of the Roe decision address many points, among them are several suggesting that it is an overreach of judicial powers, or that it was not properly based on the Constitution, or that it is an example of judicial activism and that it should be overturned so that abortion law can be decided by legislatures. Justice Potter Stewart, who joined with the majority, viewed the Roe opinion as "legislative" and asked that more consideration be paid to state legislatures.

Candidates competing for the Democratic nomination for the 2008 presidential election cited Gonzales v. Carhart as judicial activism. In upholding the Partial-Birth Abortion Ban Act, Carhart is the first judicial opinion upholding a legal barrier to a specific abortion procedure.

Where, in the performance of its judicial duties, the Court decides a case in such a way as to resolve the sort of intensely divisive controversy reflected in Roe and those rare, comparable cases, its [505 U.S. 833, 867] decision has a dimension that the resolution of the normal case does not carry. It is the dimension present whenever the Court's interpretation of the Constitution calls the contending sides of a national controversy to end their national division by accepting a common mandate rooted in the Constitution ... [W]hatever the premises of opposition may be, only the most convincing justification under accepted standards of precedent could suffice to demonstrate that a later decision overruling the first was anything but a surrender to political pressure and an unjustified repudiation of the principle on which the Court staked its authority in the first instance.

— Majority opinion of Planned Parenthood v. Casey.

Quite to the contrary, by foreclosing all democratic outlets for the deep passions this issue arouses, by banishing the issue from the political forum that gives all participants, even the losers, the satisfaction of a fair hearing and an honest fight, by continuing the imposition of a rigid national rule instead of allowing for regional differences, the Court merely prolongs and intensifies the anguish [over abortion].

— Justice Antonin Scalia, "concurring in the judgment in part and dissenting in part".

Dobbs v. Jackson overturned the Roe decision on 24 June 2022. This was a Supreme Court decision about Mississippi's law stopping abortions after 14 weeks.

Although there is a general presumption against a state's ability to regulate extraterritorially (i.e., beyond its borders), legal authority suggests that the Constitution does not prohibit a state from regulating abortion travel.

=== Canada ===
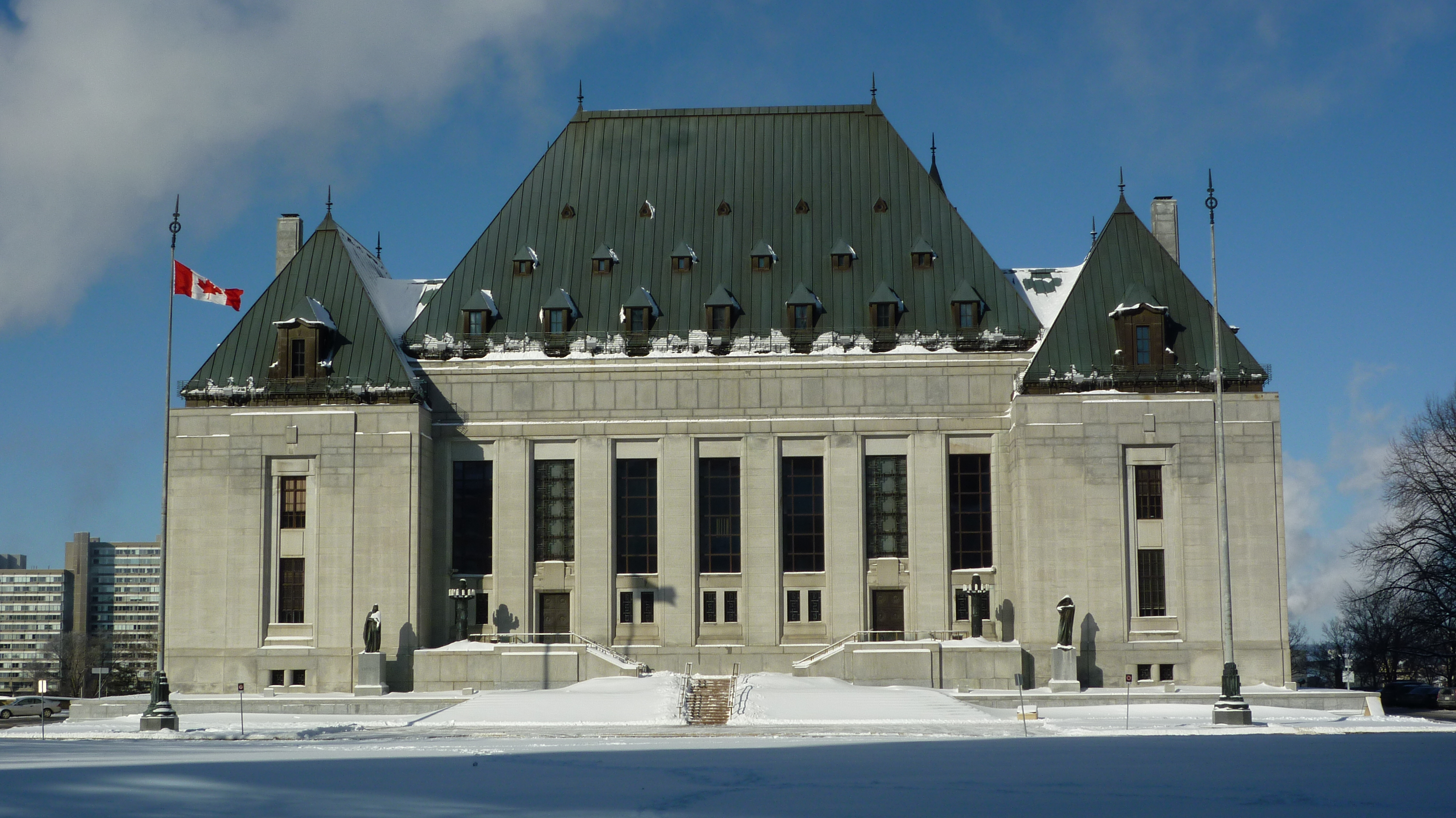
Supreme Court of Canada in Ottawa

With R v. Morgentaler, a 5–2 majority of the Supreme Court of Canada held that the abortion provisions of the Criminal Code were unconstitutional. The majority of the Court held that the abortion provisions infringed the rights of pregnant women, contrary to the security of the person clause of the Canadian Charter of Rights and Freedoms, and could not be justified. The only laws currently governing abortion in Canada are those that govern medical procedures in general, such as those regulating the licensing of facilities, the training of medical personnel, and the like. Laws also exist which are intended to prevent anti-abortion activists from interfering with staff and patient access to hospitals and clinics, for instance by creating buffer zones around them.

Because the courts did not establish abortion as a constitutional right, Parliament continues to have jurisdiction to legislate concerning abortion. The Progressive Conservative government of Brian Mulroney twice attempted to do. The first bill, introduced in 1988, was defeated in the House of Commons. The next year, in 1989, the Mulroney government introduced a bill that would allow abortion only if two doctors certified that the woman's health was in danger. This bill passed the House of Commons but was defeated by a tie vote in the Senate. There have not been any further government attempts to enact legislation relating to abortion in Parliament since then.

Although the courts have not ruled on the question of fetal personhood as a matter of constitutional law, the question has been raised in two cases, Tremblay v. Daigle and R. v. Sullivan. Both cases relied on the born alive rule, part of Canadian common law and Quebec civil law, to determine that the fetus was not a person by law.

Two further cases are notable: Dobson (Litigation Guardian of) v. Dobson, and Winnipeg Child & Family Services (Northwest Area) v G.(D.F.), which dismissed fetal abuse claims.

== Fetal pain ==
A 2005 multidisciplinary systematic review in JAMA in the area of fetal development found that a fetus is unlikely to feel pain until after the sixth month of pregnancy. Developmental neurobiologists suspect that the establishment of thalamocortical connections (at about 26 weeks) may be critical to fetal perception of pain. However, legislation was proposed by anti-abortion advocates that would require abortion providers to tell a woman that the fetus may feel pain during an abortion procedure if the woman's proposed abortion was at least 20 weeks after fertilization.

The JAMA review concluded that data from dozens of medical reports and studies indicate that fetuses are unlikely to feel pain until the third trimester of pregnancy. However several medical critics have since disputed these conclusions. Other researchers such as Anand and Fisk have challenged the idea that pain cannot be felt before 26 weeks, positing instead that pain can be felt at around 20 weeks. Anand's suggestion is disputed in a March 2010 report on fetal awareness published by a working party of the Royal College of Obstetricians and Gynaecologists (RCOG), citing a lack of evidence or rationale. Page 20 of the report definitively states that the fetus cannot feel pain before week 24. Because pain can involve sensory, emotional and cognitive factors, leaving it "impossible to know" when painful experiences are perceived, even if it is known when thalamocortical connections are established. In December 2022, the RCOG conducted a review of the existing literature surrounding fetal pain awareness, and concluded, "To date, evidence indicates that the possibility of pain perception before 28 weeks of gestation is unlikely."

Wendy Savage—former press officer, Doctors for a Woman's Choice on Abortion—considered the question to be irrelevant. In a 1997 letter to the British Medical Journal, she noted that the majority of surgical abortions in Britain were performed under general anesthesia which affects the fetus, and considers the discussion "to be unhelpful to women and to the scientific debate". Others caution against the unnecessary use of fetal anesthetic during abortion, as it poses potential health risks to the pregnant woman. David Mellor and colleagues have noted that the fetal brain is already awash in naturally occurring chemicals that keep it sedated and anesthetized until birth. At least one anesthesia researcher has suggested the fetal pain legislation may make abortions harder to obtain because abortion clinics lack the equipment and expertise to supply fetal anesthesia. Anesthesia is administered directly to fetuses only while they are undergoing surgery.

== Fetal personhood debate ==
There are differences of opinion as to whether a zygote/embryo/fetus acquires "personhood" or was always a "person". If "personhood" is acquired, opinions differ about when this happens.

Traditionally, the concept of personhood entailed the soul, a metaphysical concept referring to a non-corporeal or extra-corporeal dimension of human being. Today, the concepts of subjectivity and intersubjectivity, personhood, mind, and self have come to encompass several aspects of human beings previously considered the domain of the "soul". Thus, while the historical question has been: when does the soul enter the body, in modern terms, the question could be put instead: at what point does the developing individual develop personhood or selfhood?

Since human development occurs continuously, identifying a precise time when a human being becomes a person could lead to an instance of the Sorites paradox (also known as the paradox of the heap).

Related issues attached to the question of the beginning of human personhood include the legal status, and subjectivity of the pregnant woman and the philosophical concept of "natality" (i.e. "the distinctively human capacity to initiate a new beginning", which a new human life embodies).

In the 1973 US judgment Roe v. Wade, the opinion of the justices included the following statement:

We need not resolve the difficult question of when life begins. When those trained in the respective disciplines of medicine, philosophy, and theology are unable to arrive at any consensus, the judiciary, at this point in the development of man's knowledge, is not in a position to speculate as to the answer.

Although the two main sides of the abortion debate tend to agree that a human fetus is biologically and genetically human (that is, of the human species), they often differ in their view on whether or not a human fetus is, in any of various ways, a person. Anti-abortion supporters argue that abortion is morally wrong on the basis that a fetus is an innocent human person or because a fetus is a potential life that will, in most cases, develop into a fully functional human being. They believe that a fetus is a person upon conception. Others reject this position by distinguishing between human being and human person, arguing that while the fetus is innocent and biologically human, it is not a person with a right to life. In support of this distinction, some propose a list of criteria as markers of personhood. For example, Mary Ann Warren suggests consciousness (at least the capacity to feel pain), reasoning, self-motivation, the ability to communicate, and self-awareness. According to Warren, a being need not exhibit all of these criteria to qualify as a person with a right to life, but if a being exhibits none of them (or perhaps only one), then it is certainly not a person. Warren concludes that as the fetus satisfies only one criterion, consciousness (and this only after it becomes susceptible to pain), the fetus is not a person and abortion is therefore morally permissible. Other philosophers apply similar criteria, concluding that a fetus lacks a right to life because it lacks brain waves or higher brain function, self-consciousness, rationality, and autonomy. These lists diverge over precisely which features confer a right to life, but tend to propose various developed psychological or physiological features not found in fetuses.

Critics of this typically argue that some of the proposed criteria for personhood would disqualify two classes of born human beings – reversibly comatose patients, and human infants – from having a right to life, since they, like fetuses, are not self-conscious, do not communicate, and so on. Defenders of the proposed criteria may respond that the reversibly comatose do satisfy the relevant criteria because they "retain all their unconscious mental states". or at least some higher brain function (brain waves). Warren concedes that infants are not "persons" by her proposed criteria, and on that basis, she and others, including the moral philosopher Peter Singer, conclude that infanticide could be morally acceptable under some circumstances (for example if the infant is severely disabled or to save the lives of several other infants).

An alternative approach is to base personhood or the right to life on a being's natural or inherent capacities. On this approach, a being essentially has a right to life if it has a natural capacity to develop the relevant psychological features; and, since human beings do have this natural capacity, they essentially have a right to life beginning at conception (or whenever they come into existence). Critics of this position argue that mere genetic potential is not a plausible basis for respect (or for the right to life), and that basing a right to life on natural capacities would lead to the counterintuitive position that anencephalic infants, irreversibly comatose patients, and brain-dead patients kept alive on a medical ventilator, are all persons with a right to life. Respondents to this criticism argue that the noted human cases in fact would not be classified as persons as they do not have a natural capacity to develop any psychological features. Also, in a view that favors benefiting even unconceived but potential future persons, it has been argued as justified to abort an unintended pregnancy in favor for conceiving a new child later in better conditions.

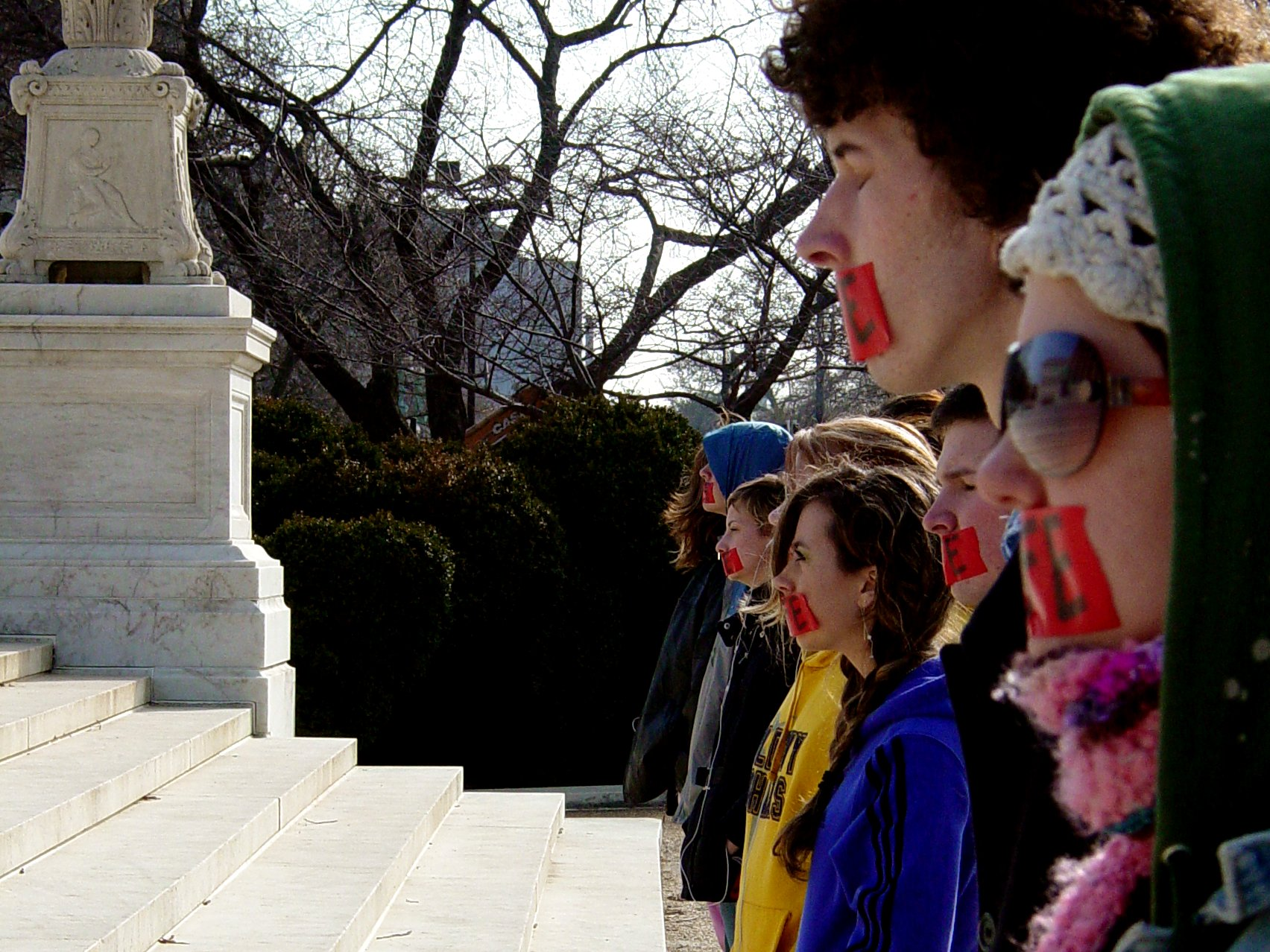
Members of Bound4LIFE in Washington, D.C. symbolically cover their mouths with red tape.

Philosophers such as Aquinas use the concept of individuation. They argue that abortion is not permissible from the point at which individual human identity is realized. Anthony Kenny argues that this can be derived from everyday beliefs and language and one can legitimately say "if my mother had had an abortion six months into her pregnancy, she would have killed me" then one can reasonably infer that at six months the "me" in question would have been an existing person with a valid claim to life. Since division of the zygote into twins through the process of monozygotic twinning can occur until the fourteenth day of pregnancy, Kenny argues that individual identity is obtained at this point and thus abortion is not permissible after two weeks.

== Arguments for abortion rights that attempt not to depend on fetal non-personhood ==
=== Bodily rights ===
An argument first presented by Judith Jarvis Thomson in her 1971 paper "A Defense of Abortion" states that even if the fetus is a person and has a right to life, abortion is morally permissible because a woman has a right to control her own body and its life-support functions (i.e. the right to life does not include the right to be kept alive by another person's body). Thomson's variant of this argument draws an analogy between forcing a woman to continue an unwanted pregnancy and forcing a person to allow his body to be used to maintain blood homeostasis (as a dialysis machine is used) for another person with kidney failure. It is argued that just as it would be permissible to "unplug" and thereby cause the death of the person who is using one's kidneys, so it is permissible to abort the fetus (who similarly, it is said, has no right to use one's body's life-support functions against one's will).

Critics of this argument generally argue that there are morally relevant disanalogies between abortion and the kidney failure scenario. For example, it is argued that the fetus is the woman's child as opposed to a mere stranger; that abortion kills the fetus rather than merely letting it die; and that in the case of pregnancy arising from voluntary intercourse, the woman has either tacitly consented to the fetus using her body, or has to allow it to use her body since she is responsible for its need to use her body. Some writers defend the analogy against these objections, arguing that the disanalogies are morally irrelevant or do not apply to abortion in the way critics have claimed.

Alternative scenarios have been put forth as more accurate and realistic representations of the moral issues present in abortion. John Noonan proposes the scenario of a family who was found to be liable for frostbite finger loss suffered by a dinner guest whom they refused to allow to stay overnight, although it was very cold outside and the guest showed signs of being sick. Noonan argues that just as it would not be permissible to refuse temporary accommodation for the guest to protect him from physical harm, it would not be permissible to refuse temporary accommodation for a fetus.

Other critics claim that there is a difference between artificial and extraordinary means of preservation, such as medical treatment, kidney dialysis, and blood transfusions, and normal and natural means of preservation, such as gestation, childbirth, and breastfeeding. They argue that if a baby was born into an environment in which there was no replacement available for her mother's breast milk, and the baby would either breastfeed or starve, the mother would have to allow the baby to breastfeed. But the mother would never have to give the baby a blood transfusion, no matter what the circumstances were. The difference between breastfeeding in that scenario and blood transfusions is the difference between using one's body as a kidney dialysis machine, and gestation and childbirth.

=== Freedom and equality ===
Margaret Sanger wrote: "No woman can call herself free until she can choose consciously whether she will or will not be a mother." From this perspective, some advocates argue that access to abortion is necessary for women to achieve social and legal equality with men, whose life choices are generally less constrained by reproduction.

While concepts like freedom and equality are interpreted differently depending on legal, cultural, and philosophical contexts, some legal scholars and human rights organizations classify reproductive rights as important civil liberties, though this classification is contested by others who view the framing as ideologically prescriptive. Arguments in support of this classification often cite considerations such as the need for consistent public policy, the potential harms of criminalizing abortion, and the unequal distribution of reproductive healthcare access. Other critics counter that framing abortion access as the primary means to gender equality risks overlooking alternative reforms—such as enhanced family support, workplace accommodation, or systemic aid for mothers—which some argue could better address root inequalities.

=== Property rights ===
Evictionism is a moral theory advanced by Walter Block and Roy Whitehead on a proposed libertarian view of abortion based on property rights. This theory is built upon the earlier work of philosopher Murray Rothbard who wrote that "no being has a right to live, unbidden, as a parasite within or upon some person's body" and that therefore the woman is entitled to eject the baby from her body at any time. Evictionists view a woman's womb as her property and an unwanted fetus as a "trespasser or parasite", even while lacking the will to act. They argue that a pregnant woman has the right to evict a fetus from her body since she has no obligation to care for a trespasser. The authors' hope is that bystanders will "homestead" the right to care for evicted babies and reduce the number of human deaths. They argue that life begins at conception and state that the act of abortion must be conceptually separated into the acts of:

1. the eviction of the fetus from the womb, and
2. the dying of the baby.

Building on the libertarian stand against trespass and murder, Block supports a right to the first act (eviction), but not the second act (murder).

Walter Block believes the woman always has a right to evict:

1. if done in the gentlest manner possible regardless of the death of the fetus, and
2. the woman has publicly announced her abandonment of the right to custody of the fetus.

=== Impacts of criminalization ===
Some activists and academics, such as Andrea Smith, argue that the criminalization of abortion furthers the marginalization of oppressed groups such as poor women and women of color. Sending these women into the prison system would do nothing to address the social/political/economic problems that marginalize these women or, sometimes, cause them to require abortions.

Some argue that race and sex-based abortions being prohibited further marginalizes oppressed groups by criminalizing those aspects of abortions. The Susan B. Anthony and Frederick Douglas Prenatal Nondiscrimination Act, proposed in Arizona in 2011, prohibited race and sex-based abortions and allowed punishment for those who perform abortions based on that criteria. The bill characterized sex-based abortions as sex-based infanticide, and abortions based on the race of the fetus, or the race of the parent of the fetus, were seen as a practice that reinforces aspects of racial discrimination. Laws like these can be seen as heightening the racialization of certain issues surrounding abortion.

According to the WHO, criminalization can have a major negative impact on "the provision of quality care" by preventing medical personnel from acting out of fear of retaliation or punishment. The 2022 LTP Evaluation found that doctors were unwilling to conduct late abortions even when the legislation allowed them, preferring to refer pregnant women to clinics abroad out of anxiety for the possibility of exposing themselves to criminal culpability.

This worry even extends to an unfounded fear of being prosecuted for sending their patient to a clinic in a different country where late abortion is permitted.

The criminalization of abortion in certain states has forced women to cross state lines for abortion care. It was found that women living in states with more hostile abortion laws were traveling out of state for abortion care in greater percentages than women living in states with protected abortion access. This also brought about the term "abortion deserts", which are locations or counties that have no abortion facilities.

People traveling interstate for abortions decrease their home state's abortion rates, but it increases the percentages of women who will need to travel across state lines to get access to abortion care. The travel also comes with other costs, such as transportation, insurance costs, missing work, childcare, etc. that impact the people who need this abortion care. These burdens tend to disproportionately affect people of color and impoverished people in need of reproductive healthcare.

Abortion criminalization also affects abortion providers by placing strict regulations and requirements on the providers. Targeted Regulation of Abortion Provider laws (TRAP laws) are state laws that impose annual licensing fees, personnel or facility mandates, etc. on facilities that want to continue to be abortion providers; these regulations are not imposed on other similar clinics or facilities. Some criticize these laws as excessive, with many of the regulations seeming excessive. Some states have requirements for room sizes and ceiling heights, room temperatures, procedure supervision, etc. that may make it harder for facilities to acquire licensure or hard for physicians to perform the procedure.

=== Inefficacy of abortion bans on reducing abortion ===
Research has been conducted exploring whether banning abortion reduces abortion rates. Researchers from the Guttmacher Institute, the World Health Organization, and the University of Massachusetts concluded that, in countries where abortions were restricted, the number of unintended pregnancies increased. The following table taken from their research shows these findings in greater detail:

Table: Rates of unintended pregnancy and abortion, and proportion of unintended pregnancies ending in abortion, by legal status of abortion for years 2015–19

	Unintended pregnancy rate per 1000 women aged between 15 and 49 years				Abortion rate per 1000 women aged between 15 and 49 years				Unintended pregnancies ending in abortion (%)			
	1990–94 (80% UI)	2015–19 (80% UI)	Change from 1990–94 to 2015–19 (80% UI)	Probability of change (%)	1990–94 (80% UI)	2015–19 (80% UI)	Change from 1990–94 to 2015–19 (80% UI)	Probability of change (%)	1990–94 (80% UI)	2015–19 (80% UI)	Change from 1990–94 to 2015–19 (80% UI)	Probability of change (%)
Abortion broadly legal	72 (66 to 80)	58 (53 to 66)	−19% (−28 to −9)	99%	44 (39 to 49)	40 (36 to 47)	−8% (−20 to 9)	73%	61 (56 to 65)	70 (65 to 73)	15% (8 to 23)	100%
Abortion broadly legal (excluding India and China)	76 (72 to 80)	50 (46 to 54)	−34% (−39 to −29)	100%	46 (43 to 50)	26 (24 to 30)	−43% (−49 to −36)	100%	61 (59 to 63)	53 (50 to 56)	−13% (−18 to −8)	100%
Abortion restricted	91 (86 to 97)	73 (68 to 79)	−20% (−25 to −14)	100%	33 (28 to 38)	36 (32 to 42)	12% (−4 to 30)	82%	36 (32 to 39)	50 (46 to 53)	39% (27 to 53)	100%
Abortion prohibited altogether	110 (100 to 123)	80 (70 to 91)	−27% (−35 to −19)	100%	35 (27 to 48)	40 (31 to 51)	11% (−14 to 40)	70%	32 (27 to 39)	50 (44 to 55)	52% (30 to 78)	100%
Abortion permitted to save the woman's life	86 (80 to 93)	70 (63 to 77)	−19% (−26 to −12)	100%	31 (27 to 38)	36 (30 to 43)	15% (−3 to 35)	85%	36 (33 to 41)	52 (48 to 56)	41% (28 to 57)	100%
Abortion permitted to preserve health	92 (86 to 99)	75 (70 to 81)	−18% (−24 to −12)	100%	33 (28 to 38)	36 (31 to 41)	8% (−8 to 27)	73%	36 (32 to 39)	47 (44 to 51)	32% (20 to 47)	100%

UI = uncertainty interval.

=== Abortion safety ===
Even where abortions are illegal, they continue to take place, however, they are generally done unsafely, both because the need for secrecy tends to be more important than the woman's safety, and due to the lack of training and experience the person performing the abortion. When done correctly by properly trained doctors, abortion is generally safe. Where laws restrict abortion rights, abortions are less safe and result in the deaths of 30,000 women each year.

=== Population planning ===
It has been suggested that access to abortion can help reduce human overpopulation, which is shown to be harmful to the natural environment.

== Arguments against abortion ==
=== Discrimination ===
The book Abortion and the Conscience of the Nation (1983) presented the argument that abortion involves unjust discrimination against the unborn. According to this argument, those who deny that fetuses have a right to life do not value all human life, but instead, select arbitrary characteristics (such as particular levels of physical or psychological development) as giving some human beings more value or rights than others.

In contrast, philosophers who define the right to life by reference to particular levels of physical or psychological development typically maintain that such characteristics are morally relevant, and reject the assumption that all human life necessarily has value (or that membership in the species Homo sapiens is in itself morally relevant).

Some abortion opponents have argued for, and promoted legislation for, a ban on the abortion of fetuses that have been diagnosed with Down syndrome on the basis that such abortions unfairly discriminate against disabled people. Critics of these measures charge that they are hypocritical since many of their proponents appear to be unconcerned with addressing the needs of living disabled persons. In response to one such proposed measure in North Carolina, a spokesperson for Disability Rights North Carolina commented, "We would never think of using limits on someone's bodily autonomy to protect our rights."

=== Deprivation ===
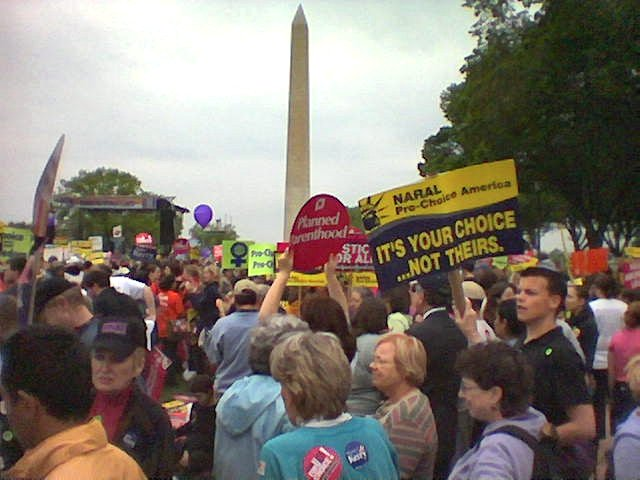
The 2004 March for Women's Lives near the Washington Monument

The argument of deprivation states that abortion is morally wrong because it deprives the fetus of a valuable future. On this account, killing an adult human being is wrong because it deprives the victim of a "future like ours"—a future containing highly valuable or desirable experiences, activities, projects, and enjoyments. If a being has such a future, then killing that being would seriously harm the fetus and hence would be seriously wrong. According to the argument, since a fetus does have such a future, the "overwhelming majority" of deliberate abortions are placed in the "same moral category" as killing an innocent adult human being. Not all abortions are unjustified according to this argument; abortion would be justified if the same justification could be applied to killing an adult human.

Criticism of this line of reasoning follows several threads. Some reject the argument on grounds relating to personal identity, holding that the fetus is "not the same entity" as the adult into which it will develop, and thus that the fetus does not have a "future like ours" in the required sense. Others grant that the fetus has a "future like ours" but argue that being deprived of this future is not significant harm or a significant wrong to the fetus because there are relatively few "psychological connections" (continuations of memory, belief, desire, and the like) between the fetus as it is now and the adult into which it will develop. Another criticism is that the argument creates inequalities in the wrongness of killing; as the futures of some people appear to be far more valuable or desirable than the futures of other people, the argument appears to entail that some killings are far more wrong than others, or that some people have a far stronger right to life than others—a conclusion that is taken to be counterintuitive or unacceptable.

=== Argument from uncertainty ===
Some anti-abortion supporters argue that if there is uncertainty as to whether the fetus has a right to life, then having an abortion is equivalent to consciously taking the risk of killing another. According to this argument, if it is not known for certain whether something (such as the fetus) has a right to life, then it is reckless and morally wrong to treat that thing as if it lacks a right to life (for example by killing it). This would place abortion in the same moral category as manslaughter (if it turns out that the fetus has a right to life) or certain forms of criminal negligence (if it turns out that the fetus does not have a right to life).

David Boonin replies that if this kind of argument were correct, then the killing of nonhuman animals and plants would also be morally wrong because Boonin contends it is not known for certain that such beings lack a right to life. Boonin also argues that arguments from uncertainty fail because the mere fact that one might be mistaken in finding certain arguments persuasive (for example, arguments for the claim that the fetus lacks a right to life) does not mean that one should act contrary to those arguments or assume them to be mistaken.

=== Slippery slope ===
A primary slippery slope argument used against the practice of abortion claims that the continuity of human life from conception onward requires that we do not arbitrarily deny life prior to any particular developmental milestone. For otherwise, it would be a slippery slope to the denial of adult human being's right to life because there would only be an arbitrary difference between the two cases. Thus the argument concludes that the only non-arbitrary and fair point at which to distinguish when human life has a stringent right to life and when it does not is at conception.

Another argument used by anti-abortion activists is the slippery slope argument, that normalizing abortion may lead to the normalization of other practices such as euthanasia.

=== Mental health ===
Some anti-abortion activists argue that having an abortion can cause long-term harm to a woman's emotional and physical health.

=== Religious beliefs ===
Views from different religions can often be in direct opposition to each other. Muslims typically cite the Quranic verse 17:31 which states that a fetus should not be aborted out of fear of poverty. Christians who oppose abortion support their views with Scripture references such as that of Luke 1:15; Jeremiah 1:4–5; Genesis 25:21–23; Matthew 1:18; and Psalm 139:13–16. The Roman Catholic Church, Eastern Orthodox Church and Oriental Orthodox Churches, constituting approximately 70% of Christians worldwide, believe that human life begins at conception, as does the right to life; thus, abortion is considered immoral. Most Evangelical Christians also consider abortion to be immoral. The Church of England also considers abortion to be morally wrong, though their position admits abortion when "the continuance of a pregnancy threatens the life of the mother".

=== Feminist arguments ===
Some feminists have argued that abortion does not liberate women, but gives society an excuse to not allow women who are mothers to access financial and social services that would benefit them more, such as better access to childcare, workplaces acknowledging the needs of mothers, and state support to help women reintegrate into the workplace. Further, they argue that if women did not have easy access to abortions, governments would be forced to invest more money into supporting mothers.

Other feminists oppose abortion because it distracts from other women's issues. Writer Megan Clancy argued that:

There are women who are raped and become pregnant; the problem is that they were raped, not that they are pregnant. There are women who are starving who become pregnant; the problem is that they are starving, not that they are pregnant. There are women in abusive relationships who become pregnant; the problem is that they are in abusive relationships, not that they are pregnant.

Some feminists have argued that abortion is inconsistent with feminist principles of justice and opposition to discrimination and violence. Feminists for Life, an anti-abortion feminist organization, argued that:

We believe in a woman's right to control her body, and she deserves this right no matter where she lives, even if she's still living inside her mother's womb.

Some feminists see abortion as an excuse for men to not take responsibility for sexually exploiting women because abortion prevents men from having to take care of any children the woman has as a result of the sexual intercourse.

=== Argument from equality and biological parents' responsibility ===
Abortion rights entail that persons capable of becoming pregnant have the right to relinquish their future parental responsibility; however, the biological fathers of their born children do not have the same right to relinquish their future parental responsibility, thereby violating equality of rights. Turning this argument around, the principle of equal rights and responsibilities, along with biological parents' responsibility toward their born children, implies that either the right to abortion or the right not to be coerced into abortion does not exist.

== Other factors ==
=== Mexico City policy ===
The Mexico City policy is a U.S. federal government policy requiring any non-governmental organization that is based outside the U.S. and receives U.S. government funding to refrain from performing or promoting abortion services. It is known by critics as the "global gag rule". Kelly Lifchez and Beatriz Maldonado cite studies showing that "the policy results in higher abortion rates, more unwanted births, higher maternal mortality, worse health status for unwanted children, and substantial reductions in the provision of family planning services in countries that rely on U.S. funding for family planning." The Mexico City policy was instituted under President Reagan, suspended under President Clinton, reinstated by President George W. Bush, suspended again by President Barack Obama on 24 January 2009 and re-instated once again by President Donald Trump on 23 January 2017. In 2021, President Biden rescinded the Mexico City policy, and on January 24, 2025, President Donald Trump reinstated the Mexico City Policy.

=== Public opinion ===
A number of opinion polls around the world have explored public opinion regarding the issue of abortion. Results have varied from poll to poll, country to country, and region to region, while varying with regard to different aspects of the issue.

In North America, a poll in April 2009 surveyed people in the United States about U.S. opinion on abortion; 18% said that abortion should be "legal in all cases", 28% said that abortion should be "legal in most cases", 28% said abortion should be "illegal in most cases" and 16% said abortion should be "illegal in all cases". A November 2005 poll in Mexico found that 73.4% think abortion should not be legalized while 11.2% think it should be. A May 2024 poll in Canada found that a majority of Canadians (80%) are in favour of a woman's right to an abortion if she so chooses, while around one in ten (11%) are opposed, and 9% do not know where they stand on the matter.

A May 2005 survey examined attitudes toward abortion in 10 European countries, asking respondents whether they agreed with the statement, "If a woman doesn't want children, she should be allowed to have an abortion". The highest level of approval was 81% (in the Czech Republic); the lowest was 47% (in Poland). In 2019, 58% of Poles supported abortion on request up to the 12th week of pregnancy.

A 2021 study showed that abortion providers faced discrimination and termination in the workplace, death threats, harassment, and impacts to their private and personal lives for them and their families. The same study shows that the providers continue to work in the field due to their commitment to women's health and pro-choice cause.

As of 2022, after the overturn of Roe vs Wade by the Supreme Court, a Wall Street Journal poll conducted in March showed that 60% of voters believed that abortion should be legal in most cases, an increase of 5% earlier in the year. 29% of participates believed it should be illegal in most cases, except for endangerment of the woman, rape, or incest. Lastly, 6% said it should be illegal in all cases, down from 11% earlier that same year. A 2024 Pew Research Center poll reported 63% of Americans believed abortion should be legal in all or most cases. The poll found that the share of Americans living in states with abortion bans or restrictions who believe abortions should be easier to access has increased by 12%. This poll found little difference based on gender (61% of men generally supportive vs 64% of women) with education and especially religious affiliation being better predictive factors. It also shows that younger people tend to be more positive towards abortion with the 50-64 group being the most negative.

African countries have different views based on region and cultural influences. In Kenya, both male and female opinions show that abortion is frowned upon, due to embedded social norms that stem from religious and cultural beliefs. While younger generations are starting to normalize abortions, limited access to procedure, high costs, and lack of information still leads to unsafe abortion practices. In Nigeria, the abortion laws are even stricter. Rather than being ostracized by the community, abortion in Nigeria can lead to life imprisonment for both the abortion seekers and those who assist them. The country's government has outlawed abortion in all cases except to save the life of the pregnant person. In a survey of women, many cited religion, incomplete abortion, future infertility, and death as a fear when seeking abortion in Nigeria.

Of attitudes in South America, a December 2003 survey found that 30% of Argentines thought that abortion in Argentina should be allowed "regardless of situation", 47% that it should be allowed "under some circumstances", and 23% that it should not be allowed "regardless of situation". A subsequent poll suggested that 45% of Argentinians are in favor of abortion for any reason in the first twelve weeks. This same poll conducted in September 2011 also suggests that most Argentinians favor abortion being legal when a woman's health or life is at risk (81%), when the pregnancy is a result of rape (80%) or the fetus has severe abnormalities (68%). A March 2007 poll regarding the abortion law in Brazil found that 65% of Brazilians believe that it "should not be modified", 16% that it should be expanded "to allow abortion in other cases", 10% that abortion should be "decriminalized", and 5% were "not sure". Later a poll made in September 2022 found that the 70% of Brazilians were against abortions, 20% were in favor of it, 8% were neither in favor or against it, and 2% didn't know what to answer. A July 2005 poll in Colombia found that 65.6% said they thought that abortion should remain illegal, 26.9% that it should be made legal, and 7.5% that they were unsure.

The attitudes in Asia vary. More secular parts of Asia such as Japan and Taiwan are more likely to favor abortion, and more religious parts such as Pakistan and Indonesia are more likely to oppose abortion. Other countries, such as China, are in between but still slightly favoring abortion. A worldwide survey conducted in 2022 reported that 14% of Chinese thought that abortion in China should be "legal in all cases", 34% that it should be "legal in most cases", 20% that it should be "illegal in most cases", and 13% that it should be "illegal in all cases", with 20% that did not respond. The same survey reported that 17% of Japanese thought that abortion in Japan should be "legal in all cases", 32% that it should be "legal in most cases", only 7% that it should be "illegal in most cases", and a very small minority of 2% that it should be "illegal in all cases", with an overwhelming 43% that did not respond. The survey also reported that 14% of Malaysians thought that abortion in Malaysia should be "legal in all cases", 18% that it should be "legal in most cases", 25% that it should be "illegal in most cases", and 20% that it should be "illegal in all cases", with 23% that did not respond, amounting to almost half the population with a negative view of abortion.

According to global surveys in 2023 and 2024, the right to access legal abortion is widely supported. There is particularly strong widespread support for legal abortion in Europe.

More than one in two (56%) across 29 countries believe abortion should be legal, including more than one in four (27%) who feel it should be legal in all cases. Support for abortion is highest in Europe, with Sweden and France having the highest level of sentiment in believing abortion should be legal (87% and 82% respectively). Support is lowest in Asia, with Indonesia and Malaysia the only countries where less than one in three think abortion should be legal (22% and 29% respectively).

=== Effect upon crime rate ===
A theory attempts to draw a correlation between the United States' unprecedented nationwide decline of the overall crime rate during the 1990s and the decriminalization of abortion 20 years prior.

The suggestion was brought to widespread attention by a 1999 academic paper, The Impact of Legalized Abortion on Crime, authored by the economists Steven D. Levitt and John Donohue. They attributed the drop in crime to a reduction in individuals said to have a higher statistical probability of committing crimes: unwanted children, especially those born to mothers who are African American, impoverished, adolescent, uneducated, and single. The change coincided with what would have been the adolescence, or peak years of potential criminality, of those who had not been born as a result of Roe v Wade and similar cases. Donohue and Levitt's study also noted that states which legalized abortion before the rest of the nation experienced the lowering crime rate pattern earlier, and those with higher abortion rates had more pronounced reductions.

Fellow economists Christopher Foote and Christopher Goetz criticized the methodology in the Donohue-Levitt study, noting a lack of accommodation for statewide yearly variations such as cocaine use, and recalculating based on incidence of crime per capita; they found no statistically significant results. Levitt and Donohue responded to this by presenting an adjusted data set which took into account these concerns and reported that the data maintained the statistical significance of their initial paper.

Such research has been criticized by some as being utilitarian, discriminatory as to race and socioeconomic class, and as promoting eugenics as a solution to crime. Levitt states in his book Freakonomics that they are neither promoting nor negating any course of action—merely reporting data as economists.

=== Breast cancer hypothesis ===
The abortion–breast cancer hypothesis posits that induced abortion may increase the risk of developing breast cancer. This 1980's paper actually contrasts with other scientific data that abortion is not related causality with breast cancer occurrence.

The hypothesis suggests that during early pregnancy, levels of estrogen increase, leading to breast growth in preparation for lactation, and if this process is interrupted by an abortion – before full maturity in the third trimester – then more relatively vulnerable immature cells could be left than there were prior to the pregnancy, resulting in a greater potential risk of breast cancer. The hypothesis mechanism was explored in rat studies conducted in the 1980s, from the same lab, so it lacks any scientific validation.

=== Minors ===
Many states require an unmarried minor to have parental consent or notification before an abortion is allowed to happen. These are known as parental involvement laws. The parents or guardians of the pregnant person must be consulted before an abortion is to be induced legally. States with these laws generally have different degrees of involvement and enforcement. A judge can be consulted to overrule a parent in the event the pregnant person is denied abortion services.

Studies have shown that these the required notification laws have not affected the probability that teenagers will engage in sexual activity or the demand for abortion. The rate of abortions for minors decreases in states with parental involvement laws by nearly 13 to 22 percent, however, it raises the rate for out-of-state abortions such in the case of Mississippi and Missouri.

Teenagers are shown to seek abortion across state lines to areas with less restrictive abortion laws to bypass these preventative methods. In the United States, 37 states require the parent to have knowledge while only 21 of those states need one parent to consent. Certain states have an alternative answer to the involvement of the parent by getting the judicial system involved with a judicial bypass. In those states, minors can get permission from the judge if parents are not willing to do so or if they are absent from their lives.

There are different guidelines for minors and abortions in every country. In most of Europe, all persons that are capable of judgment enjoy medical privacy and can decide medical matters on their own. The capability of judgment does not come at a defined age, however, and is dependent on how well the person is able to understand the decision and its consequences. For most medical procedures, the capability of judgment usually sets in at ages 12 to 14.

Parental involvement is one of the most common methods of restricting abortion, along with Medicaid funding restrictions, mandatory delay laws, licensing fees for abortion providers, and mandatory counseling laws.

Economist Marshall Medoff has argued that parental involvement laws are largely ineffective at reducing abortion demands. One cause could be that some states do not require parental involvement, so out-of-state abortions could meet the demands.

== See also ==
- Abortion: New Directions for Policy Studies
- Adriana Smith pregnancy case
- Bubble zone laws
- Conscience clause (medical)
- Consistent life ethic
- Embryonic stem cell research
- Equal Protection Clause
- Paper Abortion
- Feticide
- Opposition to the legalization of abortion
- Reproductive rights
- Roe effect
- Support for the legalization of abortion
- Philosophical aspects of the abortion debate

== Bibliography ==
- Tooley, Michael (1972). "Abortion and Infanticide". Philosophy and Public Affairs. 2 (1): 37–65. JSTOR 2264919.
- Reagan, Ronald; Clark, William P.; Johnston, Brian P.; Franz, Wanda (1983). Abortion and the Conscience of the Nation. New Regency Publishing. ISBN 0-9641125-3-1.
- Stone, Jim (December 1987). "Why Potentiality Matters". Canadian Journal of Philosophy. 17 (4): 815–830. doi:10.1080/00455091.1987.10715920. S2CID 147106418.
- Marquis, Don (April 1989). "Why Abortion is Immoral". The Journal of Philosophy. 86 (4): 183–202. doi:10.2307/2026961. JSTOR 2026961. PMID 11782094. S2CID 12645264.
- Schwarz, Stephen D. (1990). The Moral Question of Abortion. Chicago: Loyola University Press. ISBN 978-0-8294-0623-8.
- Warren, Mary Anne (1991) [1973, 1982]. "On the Moral and Legal Status of Abortion". In Mappes, Thomas A.; Zembaty, Jane S. (eds.). Biomedical Ethics (2nd ed.). New York: McGraw-Hill. pp. 438–444. ISBN 978-0-07-040126-6 – via Internet Archive.
- Lee, Patrick (1996). Abortion and Unborn Human Life. Catholic University of America Press. ISBN 978-0-8132-0846-6.
- Singer, Peter (2000). Writings on an Ethical Life. Ecco (HarperCollins). ISBN 978-0-06-019838-1.
- McMahan, Jeff (2002). The Ethics of Killing: Problems at the Margins of Life. Oxford Ethics Series. New York: Oxford University Press. ISBN 978-0-19-516982-9.
- Boonin, David (2003). A Defense of Abortion. Cambridge Studies in Philosophy and Public Policy. Boulder: University of Colorado. ISBN 978-0-521-52035-5.
- Lee, Patrick (June 2004). "The Pro-Life Argument from Substantial Identity: A Defense". Bioethics. 18 (3): 249–63. doi:10.1111/j.1467-8519.2004.00393.x. PMID 15341038. S2CID 31160912. SSRN 548046.
- Stretton, Dean (June 2004). "Essential Properties and the Right to Life: A Response to Lee". Bioethics. 18 (3): 264–282. doi:10.1111/j.1467-8519.2004.00394.x. PMID 15341039. SSRN 548047.
- Lanier, Wendy Hinote (2009). Abortion. Detroit: Lucent Books. ISBN 978-1-4205-0116-2.
- Medoff, Marshall H. (2010). "State Abortion Policies, Targeted Regulation of Abortion Provider Laws, and Abortion Demand" (PDF). Review of Policy Research. 27 (5): 577–594. doi:10.1111/j.1541-1338.2010.00460.x – via Portland State University.
- Medoff, Marshall H. (25 September 2013). "Social Policy and Abortion: A Review of the Research". The Open Demography Journal. 6 (1): 18–27. doi:10.2174/1874918601306010018. ISSN 1874-9186.
- Denbow, Jennifer M. (2016). "Abortion as Genocide: Race, Agency, and Nation in Prenatal Nondiscrimination Bans". Signs: Women in Culture and Society. 41 (3): 603–626. doi:10.1086/684239. S2CID 147059771.
- Smith, Mikaela H.; Muzyczka, Zoe; Chakraborty, Payal; Johns-Wolfe, Elaina; Higgins, Jenny; Bessett, Danielle; Norris, Alison H. (2022). "Abortion Travel Within the United States: An Observational Study of Cross-State Movement to Obtain Abortion Care in 2017" (PDF). The Lancet Regional Health - Americas. 10 100214. doi:10.1016/j.lana.2022.100214. PMC 9903901. PMID 36777689.
- Moseson, Heidi; Smith, Mikaela H.; Chakraborty, Payal; Gyuras, Hilary J.; Foster, Abigail; Bessett, Danielle; Wilkinson, Tracey; Norris, Alison (2023). "Abortion-Related Laws and Concurrent Patterns in Abortion Incidence in Indiana, 2010-2019". American Journal of Public Health. 113 (4): 429–437. doi:10.2105/AJPH.2022.307196. PMC 10003501. PMID 36795983.
- Naileg, Alex (2024). "My Future Parental Responsibility, My Choice". Elpis. 17 (2): 133–146. doi:10.54310/Elpis.2024.2.11. hdl:10831/115992.
