= Abortion: New Directions for Policy Studies =

1977 book edited by Edward Manier

- Editors: Edward Manier; William Liu; David Solomon
- Language: English
- Publisher: University of Notre Dame Press
- Publication date: 1977
- Publication place: United States

Abortion: New Directions for Policy Studies is a book edited by Edward Manier, William Liu, and David Solomon which was published in 1977 by the University of Notre Dame Press. It was based partly on the proceedings of conferences about abortion at Notre Dame in September 1973 and March 1975.

The book included chapters by Edward Manier, Edmund Pincoffs, Judith Blake, Donald Kummers, Roger Wertheimer, William Liu, and David Solomon.

== Background ==
Roe v. Wade struck down state laws banning abortion in 1973. Over twenty cases in the following years addressed abortion law in the United States and the court rulings upheld Roe v. Wade. After Roe, abortion became legal throughout the country, but states placed varying regulations on it, from requiring parental involvement in a minor's abortion to restricting late-term abortions.

After the Roe ruling, controversies continued, sometimes passionately. Judith Blake, for example, even before the ruling, predicted a backlash in attitudes about abortion in "Abortion and Public Opinion" (1971). After the ruling, her research indicated a considerable discrepancy between the views of the Court and those of the public at large.

== Reviews ==
Joseph Boyle, in a 1979 review, praised individual chapters, but noted that the volume had not managed to develop "some sort of normative consensus on abortion". He concluded that, although philosophers and theologians (including Roger Wertheimer and Edmund Pincoffs) had debated important questions such as whether there is any rational basis for deciding whether a zygote, embryo, or fetus must be considered to be a human being, their conclusions were "unlikely to be acceptable to the contesting parties." In a separate review article, Erwin Chemerinsky acknowledged cogent arguments in this volume, but concluded that "Rationalizing the abortion debate requires a comparative analysis of the options and an examination of what approaches were realistically possible for the Court to adopt."

== See also ==
- Cardinal Newman Society
- Abortion debate
