= Future of value =

Future of value may refer to:

- Future value in economics
- Future ethical value, as that of potential persons
