= Beginning of pregnancy controversy =

Cultural-linguistic, not scientific question

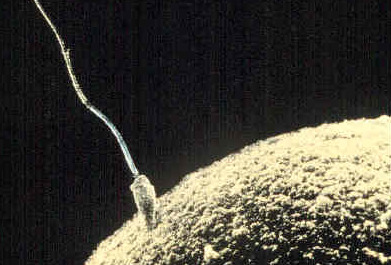
The viewpoint that pregnancy, or at least morally significant human life, begins at the exact moment that sperm and egg interact is highly controversial, although it is commonly held by groups such as the Roman Catholic Church and many traditionally religious individuals, and other alternate viewpoints are put forth.

Controversy over the beginning of pregnancy occurs in different contexts, particularly as it is discussed within the debate of abortion in the United States. Because an abortion is defined as ending an established pregnancy, rather than as destroying a fertilized egg, depending on when pregnancy is considered to begin, some methods of birth control as well as some methods of infertility treatment might be classified as causing abortions.

The controversy is not primarily a scientific issue, since knowledge of human reproduction and development has become very refined; the linguistic questions remain debated for other reasons. The issue poses larger social, legal, medical, religious, philosophical, and political ramifications because some people, such as Concerned Women for America, identify the beginning of a pregnancy as the beginning of an individual human being's life. Many of these arguments are related to the anti-abortion movement. In this way of thinking, if the pregnancy has not yet begun, then stopping the process is not abortion and therefore can contain none of the moral issues associated with abortion, but if it is a pregnancy, then stopping it is a morally significant act.

A major complication is that ideological and religious concepts such as "ensoulment" (whether or not a human being is said to have gone from mere matter to having a spiritual entity inside) and "personhood" (whether or not a human being is said to be a distinct individual with innate human rights versus otherwise) exist outside of scientific analysis, and thus many individuals have argued that the beginning of pregnancy cannot be determined strictly through physical evidence alone. No experiment exists (or can exist) to measure the spirituality of an object or living thing in the same way that height, temperature, weight, etc. can be studied.

Some ideological and religious commentaries have argued that pregnancy should be stated as beginning at the first, exact moment of conception in which a human sperm makes full contact with an egg cell. In contrast, other commentaries have argued that the duration of pregnancy begins at some other point, such as when the fertilization process ends (when a new, independent cell genetically distinct from the prior egg and sperm exists) or when implantation occurs (when the new set of cells lodges itself against the uterine wall, allowing it to grow rapidly). The ambiguity's implications mean that, despite the scientific community being able to describe the physical processes in detail, the decision about what should be called "abortion" and what should be called "contraception" or pregnancy prevention are not agreed upon.

== Definitions of pregnancy beginning ==
Comparison of dating systems for a typical pregnancy
Event	Gestational age (from the start of the last menstrual period)	Fertilization age	Implantation age
Menstrual period begins	Day 1 of pregnancy	Not pregnant	Not pregnant
Has sex and ovulates	2 weeks pregnant	Not pregnant	Not pregnant
Fertilization; cleavage stage begins	Day 15	Day 1	Not pregnant
Implantation of blastocyst begins	Day 20	Day 6	Day 0
Implantation finished	Day 26	Day 12	Day 6 (or Day 0)
Embryo stage begins; first missed period	4 weeks	Day 15	Day 9
Primitive heart function can be detected	5 weeks, 5 days	Day 26	Day 20
Fetal stage begins	10 weeks, 1 day	8 weeks, 1 day	7 weeks, 2 days
First trimester ends	13 weeks	11 weeks	10 weeks
Second trimester ends	26 weeks	24 weeks	23 weeks
Childbirth	39–40 weeks	37–38 weeks	36–37 weeks

Traditionally, doctors have measured pregnancy from a number of convenient points, including the day of last menstruation, ovulation, fertilization, implantation and chemical detection. This has led to some confusion about the precise length of human pregnancy, as each measuring point yields a different figure.

At its 2004 Annual Meeting, The American Medical Association passed a resolution in favor of making "Plan B" emergency contraception available over-the-counter, and one of the claims in the resolution was that hormonal contraception that may affect implantation "cannot terminate an established pregnancy." Similarly, the British Medical Association has defined an "established pregnancy" as beginning at implantation. The legal definition in the United Kingdom is not clear.

Other definitions exist. The American Heritage Stedman's Medical Dictionary defines "pregnancy" as "from conception until birth." Definitions like this may add to a lay person's confusion, as "conception" in a scientific context may be defined as fertilization, in a medical context can mean either fertilization or implantation but in lay terms may mean both.

Whether conception refers to fertilization or implantation would seemingly even impact "established pregnancies" such as an ectopic pregnancy. If conception is defined as at implantation, ectopic pregnancies could not be called pregnancies. However, some medical professionals who oppose birth control, such as Walter Larimore of the Focus on the Family group, have argued that the medical definition of conception should include fertilization.

Finally, the standard historical method of counting the duration of pregnancy begins from the last menstruation and this remains common with doctors, hospitals, and medical companies. This system is convenient because it is easy to determine when the last menstrual period was, while both fertilization and implantation occur out of sight. An interesting consequence is that the dating of pregnancy measured this way begins two weeks before ovulation.

Although many anti-abortion advocates have argued that both pregnancy and status of a separate human life beginning happen at fertilization, several examples also exist of people within those movements taking alternate views. For example, doctor and social activist Bernard Nathanson wrote in his 1979 work Aborting America that a confirmed moment of implantation should be considered the point at which a distinct human being exists. He specifically stated (note that 'alpha' is his shorthand for an organized group of cells), "Biochemically, this is when alpha announces its presence as part of the human community by means of its hormonal messages, which we now have the technology to receive... know[ing] biochemically that it is an independent organism distinct from the mother."

== Legal implications ==
In August 2008, the U.S. Department of Health and Human Services proposed a regulation to protect certain actions of health workers: refusal to provide patient services that the health workers believe to be abortifacient. The ban on discrimination against these employees would apply to all organizations that receive grant money from HHS. A draft version leaked in July proposed that the U.S. federal government define abortion as including "termination of [human] life... before... implantation." The official proposal dropped the definition of abortion, instead leaving it to the objecting individual to define abortion for him- or herself. Groups on both sides of the controversy believe the ban is intended to allow health workers to refuse to dispense IUDs and hormonal contraceptives, including emergency contraception. It has drawn widespread criticism from major medical and health groups.

== History ==
In the past, pregnancy has been defined in terms of conception. For example, Webster's Dictionary defined "pregnant" (or "pregnancy") as "having conceived" (or "the state of a female who has conceived"), in its 1828 and 1913 editions. However, in the absence of an accurate understanding of human development, early notions about the timing and process of conception were often vague.

Both the 1828 and 1913 editions of Webster's Dictionary said that to "conceive" meant "to receive into the womb and ... begin the formation of the embryo." However most references say that it was only in 1875 that Oskar Hertwig discovered that fertilization includes the penetration of a spermatozoon into an ovum. Thus, the term "conception" was in use long before the details of fertilization were discovered. By 1966, a more precise meaning of the word "conception" could be found in common-use dictionaries: the formation of a viable zygote.

In 1959, Dr. Bent Boving suggested that the word "conception" should be associated with the process of implantation instead of fertilization. Some thought was given to possible societal consequences, as evidenced by Boving's statement that "the social advantage of being considered to prevent conception rather than to destroy an established pregnancy could depend on something so simple as a prudent habit of speech." In 1965, the American College of Obstetricians and Gynecologists (ACOG) adopted Boving's definition: "conception is the implantation of a fertilized ovum."

The 1965 ACOG definition was imprecise because, by the time it implants, the embryo is called a blastocyst, so it was clarified in 1972 to "Conception is the implantation of the blastocyst." Some dictionaries continue to use the definition of conception as the formation of a viable zygote.

== Birth control – mechanism of action ==
Birth control methods usually prevent fertilization. This cannot be seen as abortifacient because, by any of the above definitions, pregnancy has not started. However, emergency contraception might have a secondary effect of preventing implantation, thus allowing the embryo to die. Those who define pregnancy from fertilization subsequently may conclude that the agents should be considered abortifacients.

Speculation about post-fertilization mechanisms is widespread, even appearing on patient information inserts for hormonal contraception, but there is no clinical support. One small study, using fourteen women, might be considered as providing evidence of such an effect for IUDs and a study of the combined oral contraceptive pill has been proposed.

=== Possibly affected methods ===
- Hormonal contraception, including emergency contraception, are known to be effective at preventing ovulation. Some scientists believe hormonal methods may have a secondary effect of interfering with implantation of embryos.
- Intrauterine devices (IUDs) have been proven to have strong spermicidal and ovicidal effects; the current medical consensus is that this is the only way in which they work. Still, a few physicians have suggested they may have a secondary effect of interfering with the development of pre-implanted embryos; this secondary effect is considered more plausible when the IUD is used as emergency contraception.
- The lactational amenorrhea method works primarily by preventing ovulation, but is also known to cause luteal phase defect (LPD). LPD is believed to interfere with the implantation of embryos.
- Natural Family Planning (NFP) methods are intended to prevent fertilization through avoiding intercourse during fertile periods. Luc Bovens argues that, under an assumption that the age of gametes has an effect on embryo viability, errors in NFP method result in the occurrence of lower-viability embryos. This is intended to be an ethical thought experiment; Bovens states that his assumption "is not backed up by empirical evidence, but does have a certain plausibility." His argument is controversial. The age of gametes at the time of fertilization has been shown to have no effect on miscarriage rates in most cases, but is a significant risk factor where there is history of miscarriage. Age of gametes at the time of fertilization has been shown to have no effect on low birth weight or preterm delivery.

== Viability and established pregnancy ==
A related issue that comes up in this debate is how often fertilization leads to an established, viable pregnancy. Research in in-vitro fertilization patients suggests that fertilized embryos fail to implant some 30% to 70% of the time, although it is unknown whether this rate corresponds to inherently low human implantation rates (in natural conception) or to an altered physiological state. Of those that do implant, about 25% suffer early pregnancy loss by the sixth week LMP (after the woman's Last Menstrual Period), and an additional 7% miscarry or are stillborn. As a result, even without the use of birth control, between 50% and 70% of zygotes never result in established pregnancies, much less birth.

== Ethics of preventing implantation ==
The intention of a woman to prevent pregnancy is an important factor in whether or not the act of contraception is seen as abortive by some anti-abortion groups. Hormonal contraceptives have a possible effect of preventing implantation of a blastocyst, as discussed previously. Use of these drugs with the intention of preventing pregnancy is seen by some anti-abortion groups as immoral. This is because of the possibility of causing the end of a new human life.

However, hormonal contraception can also be used as a treatment for various medical conditions. When implantation prevention is unintentionally caused as a side effect of medical treatment, such anti-abortion groups do not consider the practice to be immoral, citing the bioethical principle of double effect. Likewise, when a hormonal contraceptive is used with the intention of preventing fertilisation, the intended reduction in implantation failures, miscarriages and deaths from childbearing may outweigh the possibility that the method might cause some implantation failures.

A related application of the principle of double effect is breastfeeding. Breastfeeding greatly suppresses ovulation, but eventually an ovum is released. Luteal phase defect, caused by breastfeeding, makes the uterine lining hostile to implantation and as such may prevent implantation after fertilization. Some pro-choice groups have expressed concern that the movement to recognize hormonal contraceptives as abortifacient will also cause breastfeeding to be considered an abortion method.

== Detectable pregnancy ==
A protein called early pregnancy factor (EPF) is detectable in a woman's blood within 48 hours of ovulation if fertilization has occurred. However, testing for EPF is time-consuming and expensive; most early pregnancy tests detect human chorionic gonadotropin (hCG), a hormone that is not secreted until after implantation. Defining pregnancy as beginning at implantation thus makes pregnancy a condition that can be easily tested.

== Philosophical issues ==
The distinction in ethical value between existing persons and potential future persons has been questioned. Subsequently, it has been argued that contraception and even the decision not to procreate at all could be regarded as immoral on a similar basis as abortion. In this sense, beginning of pregnancy may not necessarily be equated with where it is ethically right or wrong to assist or intervene. In a consequentialistic point of view, an assisting or intervening action may be regarded as basically equivalent whether it is performed before, during or after the creation of a human being, because the result would basically be the same, that is, the existence or non-existence of that human being.

== See also ==
- Beginning of human personhood
- Embryo loss
- Ensoulment
- Potential person
