= Beginning of human personhood =

Opinions on when humans become persons

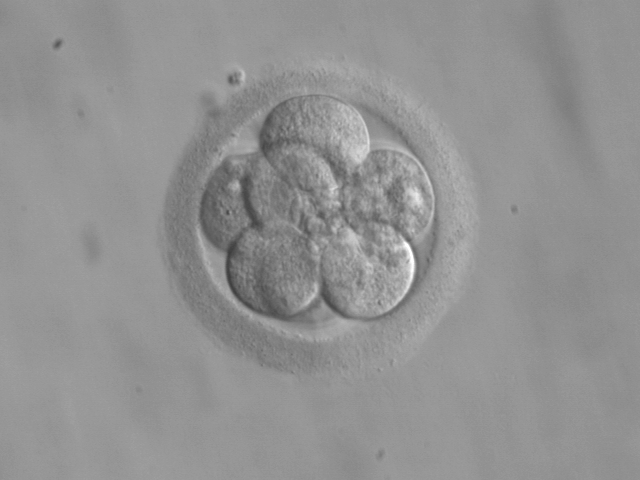
Human embryo at 8-cell stage

The beginning of human personhood is the moment when a human is first recognized as a person. There are differences of opinion about the precise time when human personhood begins and the nature of that status. The issue arises in a number of fields, including science, religion, philosophy, and law, and is most acute in debates about abortion, stem cell research, reproductive rights, and fetal rights.

Traditionally, the concept of personhood has included the concept of the soul, a metaphysical concept of a non-corporeal or extra-corporeal dimension of human beings. In modernity, the concepts of subjectivity and intersubjectivity, personhood, mind, and self have come to encompass a number of aspects of humanness that were previously considered to be characteristics of the soul. One question about the beginning of human personhood has been the moment at which soul enters the body. An alternative question, both historically and in modern times, may be at what point does the developing individual acquire personhood or selfhood. (Note: The question could also be put historically. The concept of "personhood" is of fairly recent vintage, and cannot be found in the 1828 edition of Webster's American Dictionary of the English Language, nor as late as 1913 Deprecated link archived 10 July 2012 at archive.today. A search in dictionaries and encyclopedia for the term "personhood" generally redirects to "person". The American Heritage Dictionary at Yahoo has: "The state or condition of being a person, especially having those qualities that confer distinct individuality.")

Issues relating to the question of the beginning of human personhood include the legal status, bodily integrity, and subjectivity of mothers, and the philosophical concept of natality, i.e. "the distinctively human capacity to initiate a new beginning" that a new human life embodies.

Discussions of the beginning of personhood may be framed in terms of the moment life begins. James McGrath and others argue the beginning of personhood begins is not interchangeable with the beginning of a human life. According to Jed Rubenfeld, the terms human being and person are not necessarily synonymous.

== Biological markers ==
Embryologist Scott Gilbert states:

There is no consensus among biologists as to when personhood begins. Different biologists have proposed that personhood begins at such events as fertilization, gastrulation, the acquisition of an EEG pattern, and birth. Other scientists claim that the acquisition of personhood is gradual or that the question of personhood is not a biological one.

=== Fertilization ===
Fertilization is the fusing of the gametes; a sperm cell and an ovum (egg cell) fuse to form a single-cell zygote. This is the beginning of the diploid phase of the human life cycle after two genetically unique haploid cells created via meiosis and chromosomal translocation combine their DNA and begin to develop into a multi-cellular organism. The zygote is genetically distinct from each of its parents.

The process of fertilization lasts around 24 hours. Many zygotes die shortly after fertilization, most often due to chromosomal abnormalities. Estimates of the percentage that die prior to implantation vary from 10% to 70%. Those that fail to implant in the uterine wall are sloughed off with the endometrial lining during menstruation. Of those that implant, many are miscarried, often without the woman knowing she was pregnant; estimates of post-implantation loss also vary considerably. As cleavage (cellular division) occurs, a single zygote may split into two or three zygotes, resulting in monozygotic ("identical") twins or triplets. At other times, two individually fertilized zygotes may fuse into one zygote, which is known as a chimera.

According to some commentators, life begins at the point of fertilization. Charles E. Rice said Bradley M. Patten in Foundations of Embryology wrote the union of the sperm and the ovum "initiates the life of a new individual", beginning "a new individual life history". Rice also quotes Herbert Ratner in A Doctor Talks About Abortion: "It is now of unquestionable certainty that a human being comes into existence precisely at the moment when the sperm combines with the egg". Ratner said this knowledge comes from the study of genetics. At fertilization, all of the genetic characteristics, such as the color of the eyes, "are laid down determinatively". In the college text book Psychology and Life, Floyd L. Ruch wrote: "At the moment of conception, two living germ cells (sperm and egg) unite to produce an individual". James C. G. Conniff wrote: "At that moment conception takes place and, scientists generally agree, a new life begins—silent, secret, unknown".

=== Implantation ===
In his book Aborting America, Bernard Nathanson said implantation should be considered the point at which life begins. He stated: "Biochemically, this is when alpha [the unborn human] announces its presence as part of the human community by means of its hormonal messages, which we now have the technology to receive. We also know biochemically that it is an independent organism distinct from the mother." In their book When Does Human Life Begin?, John L. Merritt and his son J. Lawrence Meritt II said if "the breath of life" (Genesis 2:7) is oxygen, then a blastocyst starts taking in the breath of life from the mother's blood at the moment it successfully implants in her womb, which usually happens nine days after fertilization. According to Goldie Milgram, Jewish tradition interprets the biblical phrase "breath of life" as the Earth's atmosphere, and that life starts when the baby's head emerges from the mother's body and takes its first breath of air.

=== Gastrulation ===
Non-conjoined monozygotic twins can form up to day 14 of embryonic development; when twinning occurs after 14 days, the twins will likely be conjoined. Gastrulation occurs at 14 days and is the stage at which non-conjoined twins can no longer form. According to Bonnie and Vern Bulloch, an early embryo cannot be a person because "If every person is an individual, one cannot be divided from oneself". Norman Ford stated: "the evidence would seem to indicate not that there is no individual at conception, but that there is at least one and possibly more". He went on to support the idea, similar to processes in other species, one twin could be the parent of the other asexually. Theodore Hall agreed with the plausibility of this explanation, saying: "We wonder if the biological process in twinning isn't simply another example of how nature reproduces from other individuals without destroying that person's or persons' individuality". Gilbert quotes bioethicist Robert Green as saying: "Only at gastrulation can we say that the lengthy process of individuation is complete".

=== Brain function (brain birth) ===
According to D.G. Jones, there are two types of brain death—whole brain death, the irreversible cessation of function of both the brain stem and higher parts of the brain—and higher-brain death, destruction of the cerebral hemispheres alone, with possible retention of brain stem function; and analogously, there are two types of brain birth based on their reversal—brain-stem birth at the first appearance of brain waves in lower brain (brain stem) at 6–8 weeks of gestation, and higher-brain birth at the first appearance of brain waves in higher brain (cerebral cortex) at 22–24 weeks of gestation.

=== Fetal viability ===
The perspective of Planned Parenthood, a major abortion provider in the United States, is based on fetal viability. It stated:

Until the fetus is viable, any rights granted to it may come at the expense of the pregnant woman, simply because the fetus cannot survive except within the woman's body. Upon viability, the pregnancy can be terminated, as by a c-section or induced labor, with the fetus surviving to become a newborn infant. Several groups believe that abortion before viability is acceptable, but is unacceptable after."

In some countries, early abortions are legal in all circumstances but late-term abortions are limited to circumstances in which there is a clear medical need. There is no sharp limit of development, gestational age, or weight at which a human fetus automatically becomes viable. A 2013 study said: "While only a small proportion of births occur before 24 completed weeks of gestation (about 1 per 1000), survival is rare and most of them are either fetal deaths or live births followed by a neonatal death".

=== Birth ===
Some commentators believe while the fetus is still inside the mother's body, whether it is viable or not, it has no rights of its own. In some interpretations of Jewish law, life begins at first breath; other interpretations state: "the unborn child, although a living being, does not yet have a status of personhood equal to its mother".

=== Whether this is a scientific question ===
Some biologists say the beginning of personhood is not a question they can answer. In 1981, Senator Jesse Helms introduced a Human Life Bill that said: "Congress finds that present day scientific evidence indicates a significant likelihood that actual human life exists at conception" and that 'person' shall include all human life as defined herein", provoking a response from many scientists and medical professionals. The National Academy of Sciences passed a resolution saying the question of whether human life exists from conception was "a question to which science can provide no answer ... Defining the time at which the developing embryo becomes a person must remain a matter of moral or religious value". A group of over 1,200 scientists signed a petition that said: "As scientists we agree that science cannot define the moment at which 'actual human life' begins and consider that the attempt to reach a scientific resolution of this question represents a misuse and misunderstanding of science". A series of Senate hearings were also held, and many scientists and medical professionals testified. Some said life begins at conception but others said this was not a question answerable by science. Lewis Thomas said: "whether the very first single cell that comes into existence after fertilization of an ovum represents in itself a human life, is not in any real sense a scientific question and cannot be answered by scientists ... it can be argued by philosophers and theologians, but it lies beyond the reach of science." Frederick Robbins said: "the question of when life begins is not in essence, a scientific matter. Rather it is one that evokes complicated ethical and value judgments. In fact, I doubt whether the health sciences can shed much light on such moral questions."

== Other markers ==
There are also other ideas of when personhood is achieved:

- at ensoulment, or quickening
- at "formation" – an early concept of bodily development (see preformationism).
- at the emergence of consciousness
- at the emergence of rationality (see Immanuel Kant)

Human personhood may also be seen as a work in progress, with the beginning being a continuum rather than a moment in time.

=== Individuation ===
Philosophers such as Aquinas use the concept of individuation. They say abortion is not permissible from the point at which individual human identity is realized. According to Anthony Kenny, this can be derived from everyday beliefs and language, and one can say: "if my mother had an abortion six months into her pregnancy, she would have killed me", then one can reasonably infer at six months, the me in question would have been an existing person with a valid claim to life. Because division of the zygote into twins through the process of monozygotic twinning can occur until the fourteenth day of pregnancy, Kenny says individual identity is obtained at this point and thus abortion is not permissible after two weeks.

=== Quickening ===
Quickening is the moment the pregnant woman starts to feel the fetus's movement in the uterus. The word quick originally meant alive, and quicken means to grant life. Women who have previously given birth have more-relaxed uterine muscles that are more sensitive to fetal motion during subsequent pregnancies. For them, fetal motion can sometimes be felt as early as 14 weeks, although it is usually around 18 weeks. A woman who has not previously given birth typically feels fetal movements at about 20–21 weeks. Some early abortion laws were based around this standard. Although not commonly in use today, the quickening standard for personhood was historically used in England, and other jurisdictions that based their legal systems on the English legal system, like the U.S. states of Connecticut and New York.

=== Adulthood ===
Historically, children were not always seen as people. Infanticide was practiced in many historical cultures. Until the mid 19th century, U.S. law was ambiguous about the personhood of children under 18.

== Philosophical and religious perspectives ==
Ideas about the beginnings of human life and personhood have varied among social contexts, and have changed with shifts in ethical and religious beliefs, sometimes as a result of advances in scientific knowledge; in general, they have developed in parallel with attitudes to abortion and the use of infanticide for reproductive control. Because human development is continuous, identifying a time at which a human is a person could lead to an instance of the Sorites paradox, also known as the paradox of the heap.

According to Neil Postman, in pre-modern societies, the lives of children were not regarded as unique or valuable in the same way as they are in modern societies, in part as a result of high infant mortality. When childhood began to develop its own distinctive features, including graded schools to teach literacy, other skills, and cultural knowledge, this view changed. According to Postman: "the custom of celebrating a child's birthday did not exist in America throughout most of the eighteenth century, and, in fact, the precise marking of a child's age in any way is a relatively recent cultural habit, no more than two hundred years old".

Ancient writers held diverse views on the beginning of personhood, which they understood as the soul's entry into or development in the human body. In Panpsychism in the West, David Skrbina noted the kinds of soul the early Greeks envisioned. Aristotle developed a theory of progressive ensoulment; in his text On the Generation of Animals, he said the soul first develops a vegetative soul, then animal, and finally human, adding abortions were permissible early in pregnancy before certain biological processes began. He believed the female substance was passive, the male substance was active, and that time was required for the male substance to "animate" the whole.

According to Hinduism Today, Vedic literature states the soul enters the body at conception. According to the Jewish Talmud, all life is precious but a fetus is not a person, in the sense of termination of pregnancy being considered murder. If a woman's life is endangered by a pregnancy, an abortion is permitted but if the "greater part" of the fetus has emerged from the womb, then its life may not be taken, even to save the mother "because you cannot choose between one human life and another".

According to some medieval Christian theologians, ensoulment occurs when a baby takes its first breath of air. They cite, among other passages, Genesis 2:7, which reads: "And the Lord God formed man of the dust of the ground, and breathed into his nostrils the breath of life; and man became a living soul". The early Church held various views on the subject, mostly either that ensoulment occurs at conception or one of delayed hominization. Tertullian held the view the soul is derived from the parents and generated in parallel with the physical body; this view, which is known as traducianism, was later rejected by Augustine of Hippo because it did not account for original sin. Basing himself on the Septuagint version of Exodus 21:22, Augustine affirmed the Aristotelian view of delayed hominization. Thomas Aquinas and Augustine of Hippo held the view fetuses were "animated"—Aristotle's term for ensoulment—near the 40th day after conception; both held abortion is always gravely wrong because it involves the medical termination of a developing person in development.

In general, the soul was viewed as some kind of animating principle, and the human soul was referred to as the "rational soul". Some followers of Jainism promoted the idea sperm cells contain life (jivas) and thus harming them opposes the principle of non-violence (ahimsa). Celibacy or abstinence from sex (bramacharya) can be practiced to avoid releasing sperm but this is unrelated to the broader practice of celibacy in Jainism.

The Roman Catholic Church considers fertilization as the beginning of an individual's existence; its Pontifical Academy for Life said: "The moment that marks the beginning of the existence of a new 'human being' is constituted by the penetration of sperm into the oocyte. Fertilization promotes a series of linked events and transforms the egg cell into a 'zygote'." The Congregation for the Doctrine of the Faith also has stated: "From the time that the ovum is fertilized, a new life is begun which is neither that of the father nor of the mother; it is rather the life of a new human being with his own growth". (Note: The cited document adds: "The Magisterium has not expressly committed itself to an affirmation of a philosophical nature (on the moment of appearance of a spiritual soul) but it constantly reaffirms the moral condemnation of any kind of procured abortion.")

== Ethical perspectives ==
The distinction in ethical value between existing persons and potential future persons has been questioned. It has been argued contraception and the decision not to procreate could be regarded as immoral on a similar basis to abortion. Any marker of the beginning of human personhood does not necessarily mark the moment where assistance or intervention are ethically correct or incorrect. In a consequentialistic point of view, an assisting or intervening action may be regarded as equivalent whether it is performed before, during, or after the creation of a human being because the result would be the same, that is, the existence or non-existence of a human being. In a view holding the value of the bringing into existence of potential persons, it has been argued the abortion of an unintended pregnancy in favor for conceiving a new child later in better conditions is justified.

== Personhood in law ==
=== Ecclesiastical courts ===
Following the decline of the Western Roman Empire and the adoption of Christianity as the Roman state religion, ecclesiastical courts held wide jurisdiction throughout Europe. According to Donald DeMarco, the Church treated the killing of an unformed or "unanimated" fetus as a matter of "anticipated homicide", with a corresponding lesser penance required. According to the Catechism of the Catholic Church: "Human life must be respected and protected absolutely from the moment of conception. From the first moment of his existence, a human being must be recognized as having the rights of a person—among which is the inviolable right of every innocent being to life."

=== Common law ===
Abortion in the United Kingdom was traditionally dealt with in the ecclesiastical courts, but from 1115, English common law addressed the issue, beginning with first mention in Leges Henrici Primi. In this treatise, abortion, even that of a "formed" fetus, was a "quasi-homicide", carrying a penalty of 10 years' penance, a much-lesser penalty than would accrue to full homicide. With the exception of Bracton, later writers said killing a fetus is "great misprision, and no murder", as formulated by Sir Edward Coke in his Institutes of the Lawes of England. Coke noted the murder victim must have been "a reasonable creature in rerum natura", in accordance with the standards of murder in English law. Sir William Blackstone repeated this formulation in England and in Bouvier's Law Dictionary in the United States. The reasonableness of the creature is of considerable weight in the legal conception of personhood. Children are not considered full persons under the law until they reach the age of majority. Children have been treated as persons with respect to bodily offences, beginning with Offences against the Person Act 1828, although this protection did not prevent parents from selling their children, as in the Eliza Armstrong case, long after the slave trade had been abolished in England. In addition, common law regarded "a child en ventre sa mere" (in utero) as "in being" or "as born" when ensuring wills and trusts did not run afoul of the rule against perpetuities; nine or sometimes ten months of gestation were allotted for this purpose.

== Legal perspectives ==
=== Australia ===
In 2013, the Parliament of New South Wales considered a bill known as "Zoe's law", which was widely perceived as recognizing a fetus of 20 weeks as a legal person. The bill was introduced in response to the experience of Brodie Donegan, eight months pregnant, whose unborn daughter named Zoe was killed in a road accident and who was distraught the law did not consider Zoe a victim of the crime in her own right rather than as an aspect of her mother's injuries. Opponents of the bill said it threatened the legality of abortion; supporters of the bill said this concern was unjustified because its text excluded abortion from its scope. Donegan identifies as pro-choice. While the NSW Legislative Assembly passed the bill, it failed to pass in the upper house, the Legislative Council, and the bill in that form was abandoned in November 2014.

In November 2021, the NSW government introduced a new version of "Zoe's law" that criminalized the causing of the death of a fetus of at least 20 weeks gestation; or at least 400 g (14 oz) if the gestational age could not be determined, by criminally killing or injuring the mother. That bill was passed later that month as the Crimes Legislation Amendment (Loss of Foetus) Act 2021. The law entered into force on 29 March 2022.

=== Ireland ===
The 1983 Eighth Amendment granted the full right to life and personhood to any "unborn". Abortion was banned in nearly all cases, except to save the life of the mother. This law was repealed on 25 May 2018 by a 66% voting margin and abortion became legal on 1 January 2019.

=== United States ===
In its 1885 decision McArthur v. Scott, the Supreme Court of the United States affirmed the common-law principle that a child in its mother's womb can be regarded as "in being" for the purpose of resolving a dispute about wills and trusts. In 1973, Harry Blackmun wrote the court opinion for Roe v. Wade, addressing the issue of human personhood in relation to abortion rights. The court said: "We need not resolve the difficult question of when life begins. When those trained in the respective disciplines of medicine, philosophy, and theology are unable to arrive at any consensus, the judiciary, at this point in the development of man's knowledge, is not in a position to speculate". The court also stated: "the word 'person,' as used in the Fourteenth Amendment, does not include the unborn".

Several attempts were made to pass a Human Life Amendment in Congress. Some versions defined the word "person" in the Fifth and Fourteenth amendments to apply to all human beings starting at conception. Some states have amended or attempted to amend their state constitutions to define personhood as starting at conception.

In 2002, the Born-Alive Infants Protection Act was enacted, which ensures the legal concepts of person, baby, infant, and child include those that have been born alive in the course of a miscarriage or abortion, regardless of development, gestational age, or whether the placenta and umbilical cord are still attached. This law makes no comment on personhood in utero but ensures no person after birth is characterized as not a person. In 2003, the Partial-Birth Abortion Ban Act, prohibits an abortion if "either the entire baby's head is outside the body of the mother, or any part of the baby's trunk past the navel is outside the body of the mother", was enacted. In 2004, President George W. Bush signed the Unborn Victims of Violence Act into law. The law extends personhood status to a "child in utero at any stage of development, who is carried in the womb", if they are targeted, injured, or killed during the commission of any of over 60 listed violent crimes. The law also prohibits the prosecutions of "any person for conduct relating" to a legally consented-to abortion. Since then, 38 U.S. states legally recognized a human fetus or "unborn child" as a crime victim for the purpose of homicide or feticide laws. According to progressive media watchdog Media Matters for America:

Further, a prenatal personhood measure might subject a woman who suffers a pregnancy-related complication or a miscarriage to criminal investigations and possibly jail time for homicide, manslaughter or reckless endangerment. And because so many laws use the terms 'persons' or 'people', a prenatal personhood measure could affect large numbers of a state's laws, changing the application of thousands of laws and resulting in unforeseeable, unintended, and absurd consequences.

The 1992 Supreme Court case of Planned Parenthood v. Casey held a law cannot place legal restrictions imposing an undue burden for "the purpose or effect of placing a substantial obstacle in the path of a woman seeking an abortion of a nonviable fetus". This standard was upheld in the Supreme Court case of Whole Woman's Health v. Hellerstedt (2016), in which several Texas restrictions were struck down; it was overturned in 2022 by Dobbs v. Jackson Women's Health Organization, holding there was no constitutional right to an abortion. In 2024, the Alabama Supreme Court ruled frozen embryos were "extrauterine children", and thus were legally children in the State of Alabama. In a concurring opinion, Alabama Chief Justice Tom Parker discussed the issue "theologically": "human life cannot be wrongfully destroyed without incurring the wrath of a holy God" because "even before birth, all human beings bear the image of God, and their lives cannot be destroyed without effacing his glory". The court's ruling led three major Alabama medical providers to discontinue in-vitro fertilization treatment because of the legal uncertainty the decision created. The U.S. President Joe Biden described the ruling as "outrageous and unacceptable".

== See also ==
- Beginning of pregnancy controversy
- Contraception Begins at Erection Act
- Human life (disambiguation)
- Philosophical aspects of the abortion debate
