= Goldie Milgram =

American rabbi, educator, and writer (born 1955)

Rabbi Goldie Milgram (born 1955) is an American rabbi, educator, and writer. She is best known as the "rebbe-on-the-road," for her travels worldwide as a seeker and teacher of Torah, Jewish spiritual practices and she is a specialist in the fields of Jewish experiential and spiritual education. "Reb Goldie" founded (2000) and heads the 501C3 non-profit Reclaiming Judaism, serves as editor-in-chief for Reclaiming Judaism Press, and in 2014 she founded a three-year distance-learned training program for Jewish educators titled Jewish Spiritual Education (JSE): Maggid-Educator Training.

Her publications are numerous. They begin with Reclaiming Judaism as a Spiritual Practice: Holy Days and Shabbat (Jewish Lights Publishing) and Make Your Own Bar/Bat Mitzvah: A Personal Approach to Creating a Meaningful Rite of Passage. She founded and serves as Editor-in-Chief of Reclaiming Judaism Press and the Jewish spiritual education website and non-profit ReclaimingJudaism.org, with a first book release in 2009 titled Seeking and Soaring: Jewish Approaches to Spiritual Direction. Rabbi Milgram also has served as editor of the "Living Judaism" section of the Philadelphia Jewish Voice., a dean of the Academy for Jewish Religion, a founding faculty member of the Aleph Ordination Program, and a wide range of positions in Jewish life from Jewish Federation Executive, executive of Jewish agencies and schools, through leadership in summer camps, Jewish campus organizations, and teaching for programs such as Project Kesher, 92nd St Y, AMA, APA, Esalen, New York Open Center, and congregations, organizations, and universities worldwide.

== Education ==
Rabbi Milgram received her undergraduate degree from the University of Pennsylvania in 1975, her MSW from the Wurzweiler School of Yeshiva University in 1979, her Masters in Hebrew Letters and Rabbinic Ordination from the Reconstructionist Rabbinical College in 1993, and her doctorate from New York Theological Seminary. She also holds rabbinic, mashpi'ah, and shaliach ordination from Rabbi Zalman Schachter-Shalomi of the Jewish Renewal movement. She has been featured at the Jewish Futures Conference, honored by the American Cancer Society, and her programs, publications and resources have been honored by the Covenant Foundation and the National Jewish Book Awards.

== Publications ==
=== Books ===
- Rabbi Goldie Milgram (January 2014). Reclaiming Bar/Bat Mitzvah as a Spiritual Rite of Passage: An Empowering Guide for Students, Families, Educators and Clergy. Sarasota, FL: Reclaiming Judaism Press.
- Goldie Milgram and Shohama Wiener, ed. (April 2014). Seeking and Soaring: Jewish Approaches to Spiritual Guidance and Development 2nd Ed. Sarasota, FL: Reclaiming Judaism Press.
- Goldie Milgram and Ellen Frankel, ed. (March 2015). New Mitzvah Stories for the Whole Family. Sarasota, FL: Reclaiming Judaism Press.
- Goldie Milgram and Ellen Frankel, ed. (December 2011). Mitzvah Stories: Seeds for Inspiration and Learning. Sarasota, FL: Reclaiming Judaism Press.
- Rabbi Goldie Milgram, ed. (August 2009). Seeking and Soaring: Jewish Approaches to Spiritual Direction. Sarasota, FL: Reclaiming Judaism Press.
- Rabbi Goldie Milgram (January 2009). Living Jewish Life Cycle: How to Create Meaningful Jewish Rites of Passage for Every Stage of Life. Woodstock, Vermont: Jewish Lights Publishing.
- Rabbi Goldie Milgram (August 2005). Meaning and Mitzvah: Daily Practices for Reclaiming Judaism through God, Prayer, Torah, Mitzvot, Hebrew and Peoplehood. Woodstock, Vermont: Jewish Lights Publishing.
- Rabbi Goldie Milgram (August 2004). Reclaiming Judaism as a Spiritual Practice: Holy Days and Shabbat. Woodstock, Vermont: Jewish Lights Publishing.
- Rabbi Goldie Milgram (August 2004). Make Your Own Bar/Bat Mitzvah: A Personal Guide to a Meaningful Rite of Passage. San Francisco, California: Jossey-Bass Publishing.

=== Selected articles ===
- Rabbi Goldie Milgram (March 2006), "Introduction to Jewish Meditation", in Berman, Dr. Robin E.; Kurzweil, Arthur; Mintz, Dale L. (eds.), The Hadassah Jewish Family Book of Health and Wellness, San Francisco, California: Jossey-Bass Publishing
- Rabbi Goldie Milgram (Fall 2005), "Repenting for Those Who Cannot; Teshuvah Walks", in Dov Peretz Elkins (ed.), Yom Kippur Readings: Inspiration, Information and Contemplation, Jewish Lights Publishing
- Rabbi Goldie Milgram (Fall 2005), "Teshuvah Walks", in Dov Peretz Elkins (ed.), Yom Kippur Readings: Inspiration, Information and Contemplation, Jewish Lights Publishing
- Rabbi Goldie Milgram (December 2010), "Reframing the Hanukkah Christmas Dilemma", Philadelphia Jewish Voice
- Rabbi Goldie Milgram (April–May 2010), "Hope from Trauma: Listening and Learning about Loss, Love and Guilt", Philadelphia Jewish Voice
- Rabbi Goldie Milgram (2006), "What Does Judaism Have to Say about Organ Donation", Philadelphia Jewish Voice
- Rabbi Goldie Milgram (March 2005), "Water as a Portal to Sacred Consciousness", The Living Pulpit, vol. 14, no. 1
- Rabbi Goldie Milgram (September 2005), "Burnt to a Crisp? A Cautionary Mystical Optimism", Elixir Magazine, vol. 1, no. 1
- Rabbi Goldie Milgram (2008). "The Druze Man and My Father". In Jeffrey Salkin (ed.). A Dream of Zion: Americans Talk about Why Israel Matters to Them. Woodstock, Vermont: Jewish Lights Publishing.
