= Philadelphia Jewish Voice =

American monthly online journal

- Type: Monthly online journal
- Founded: 2005
- Language: English
- City: Philadelphia, Pennsylvania
- Website: http://pjvoice.org/

The Philadelphia Jewish Voice is a monthly online journal that addressed the critical social and political issues facing the Jewish community of the metropolitan Philadelphia area and beyond. Founded in the summer of 2005, Philadelphia Jewish Voice functions as a non-profit corporation and is staffed entirely by volunteers committed to reflecting the diversity of opinion within the Jewish community. Subscriptions is free. The current editor-in-chief is Adena Potok, widow of the author Chaim Potok. The publisher is Daniel Elliott Loeb.
