= Bound4life =

Grassroots anti-abortion organization

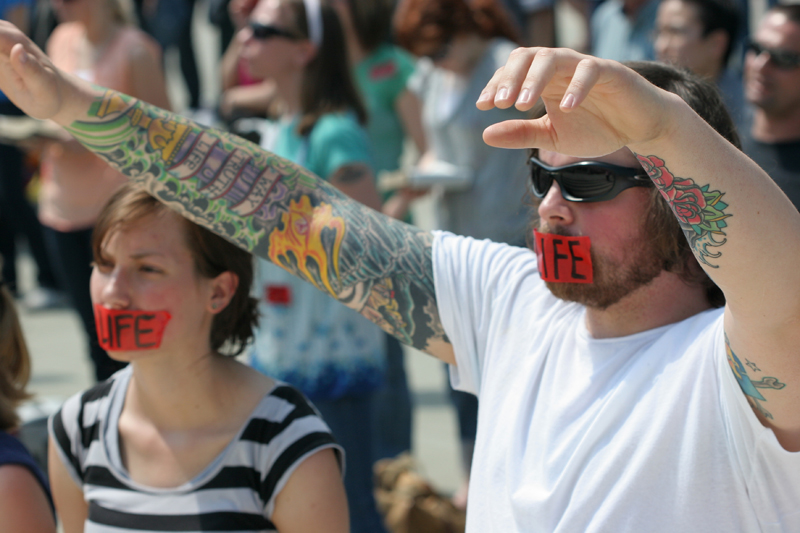
Young adults pray in front of the U.S. Supreme Court with red life tape over their mouths.

Bound4LIFE is a grassroots anti-abortion organization originating in the United States. The non-profit organization was founded in 2004 by Lou Engle while gathered for silent prayer in front of the United States Supreme Court in Washington, DC. A major goal of the organization is to train and multiply the number of Christians that pray regularly for the ending of abortion.

== Activism ==
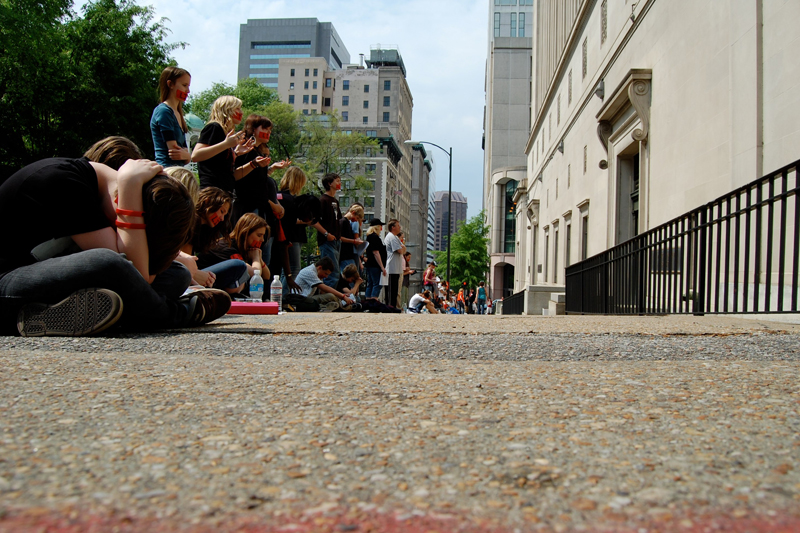
A 2008 "Silent Siege" where youth prayed silently for the ending of abortion.

The key identifying element of the movement is a piece of red tape with the word "LIFE" handwritten on it that is worn over the mouth during prayer gatherings. "Taping their mouths shut" is a voluntary way of promoting prayer as opposed to vocal protest. The organization's motto is "It's not a protest. It's a prayer meeting."

The organization encourages participants to make a three-part pledge. The first deals with praying daily for abortion to end; presumably for the 1973 Supreme Court decision Roe v. Wade to be overturned. The second part calls for participants to only vote for candidates that support a similar point of view concerning abortion. The final part calls for participants to "obey God in acts of compassion and justice." Participants wear a red "life" wristband, sold by the organization, as a symbol of this pledge.

== Reception ==
In its 5-year anniversary issue, Relevant Magazine listed Lou Engle and the red "LIFE" tape as one of the Top 35 Ideas That Have Changed the World.
