= Abortion in Malaysia =

The laws pertaining to abortion in Malaysia are generally ambiguous and specific legislation varies greatly by state. Access to abortion in Malaysia has been hampered by religious, cultural and social stigmas against abortion, poor awareness of abortion legislation among health professionals and the high cost of abortion services in the private health sector. As a result, risky unsafe abortions are prevalent in Malaysia. Under Sections 312–316 of the Penal Code, it is de jure permitted to perform an abortion to save the life of the mother or in cases where their physical or mental health is at risk, for the first 120 days (approximately 4 months) of gestation.

As a Muslim country, Malaysia also has a dual legal system with Muslims, which make up the majority of the population, being subject to Sharia law. In 2002, the National Fatwa Council issued a fatwa permitting abortion up to 120 days of gestation in cases when the mother's life is in danger or fetal impairment. Abortion on the grounds of rape, incest, on request or due to economical and social factors remain illegal.

== Legislation and regulations ==
During the British colonial era, abortion in Malaya was regulated by the British Empire's 1871 Indian penal code, which banned abortion on all grounds. Other historical legislation included the 1956 Medicines Advertisement and Sale Act, which prohibited the publication of abortion advertisements.

Abortion in Malaysia is currently regulated under Sections 312–316 of the Penal Code:

1. Section 312 states that those who induce an abortion with a woman's consent can be imprisoned for a term of three years or fined or both. If the woman is "quick with child" (meaning beyond her fourth month of pregnancy), the woman and provider can be sentenced to up to seven years' imprisonment or fined.
2. Section 313 states that those who cause an abortion without a woman's consent can be imprisoned for 20 years or fined.
3. Section 314 states that whoever causes an involuntary abortion that leads to the woman's death can be imprisoned for ten years or fined.
4. Section 315 states that whoever prevents a child from being born alive or causes it to die after birth can be imprisoned for ten years or fined unless it is for the purpose of saving the mother's life.
5. Section 316 classifies causing the death of a "quick unborn child" as culpable homicide.

In 1971, the Parliament of Malaysia amended Section 312 of the Penal Code to permit abortion to save a woman's life. In 1989, Section 312 was amended again to permit abortion to safeguard a woman's mental and physical health.

In addition, Section 309 of the Penal Code bans infanticide, prescribing a term of imprisonment of twenty years and a fine. The ban on infanticide has led to a high rate of abandoned babies. Between 2005 and 2011, there were a reported 517 cases of abandoned babies in Malaysia. In 2016, there were a reported 115 abandoned babies. In April 2010, the Minister of Women, Family and Community Development Shahrizat Abdul Jalil announced that the Government had classified "baby dumping" as a capital punishment offence. In response, the Prime Minister Najib Razak clarified that the Attorney General would only be prescribing the death penalty on a case-by-case basis.

== Notable court cases ==
Between 1958 and 1985, three medical professionals were prosecuted for inducing abortions in Binti AH v Public Prosecutor (1958), Mary Shim v Public Prosecutor (1962), and Public Prosecutor v Dr Nadason Kanagalingam (1985). According to Archer, these three court cases set the precedent for criminalizing abortion in Malaysia. In addition, the Malaysian Government has prosecuted several cases of infanticide. In the 1987 case Public Prosecutor vs Zamihiyah, the defendant, who was suffering from postpartum psychosis, was sentenced to time served after throwing her two-month old baby out of a car. In 2012, a 19-year-old woman was sentenced to twelve years imprisonment for throwing her newborn baby out a window. In 2014, a 26-year-old Indonesian domestic worker was sentenced to eight years imprisonment for killing her child in order to preserve her job. That same year, a 20-year-old college student faced trial for killing her newborn inside a hostel toilet.

=== Nirmala abortion case, 2014–2015 ===
In 2014, the 24-year-old Nepalese migrant worker Nirmala Thapa became the first woman in Malaysia to be tried and convicted of abortion. In early October 2014, Nirmala obtained an abortion at a clinic in Penang. The clinic was subsequently raided by the Royal Malaysia Police and the doctor was arrested. In November 2014, the Penang High Court found Nirmala guilty and sentenced her to one year's imprisonment. Her trial and conviction generated substantial media coverage in Malaysia and abroad. The Reproductive Rights Advocacy Alliance of Malaysia (RRAAM) appealed Nirmala's conviction. In January 2015, the Penang High Court quashed her conviction on the grounds that Nirmala had been poorly represented during her first trial. The case was subsequently retried at the Bukit Mertajam Sessions Court where Nirmala's defence lawyer successfully argued that continuing the pregnancy would have posed a risk to Nirmala's life. On 21 September, Judge M Vijayalakshmi acquitted and discharged Nirmala on the grounds that the prosecution had failed to prove its case.

The Malaysian authorities subsequently prosecuted Nirmala's physician, Dr Ng, under Private Healthcare Facilities and Services Act on the grounds that his clinic was unsuitable for abortion services. On the day of the hearing, the defence sought clarification on the charge against Ng. After consulting with the Attorney General, the prosecution dropped the charge completely. Nirmala's case has been regarded as a landmark case for abortion rights in Malaysia. Following her acquittal, the Joint Action Group of Gender Equality (JAG), an umbrella body representing 11 Malaysian women's rights groups, called on the Malaysian Government to ensure that no women would be prosecuted for abortion in the future.

== Abortion services and statistics ==
As of 2018, the Federation of Reproductive Health Associations Malaysia (FRHAM) has estimated that there are about 90,000 abortions performed annually in Malaysia. Similarly, the Reproductive Rights Advocacy Alliance Malaysia (RRAAM) has estimated that there are about 240 clinics nationwide offering abortion services. While public hospitals and clinics are reluctant to provide abortion services except in circumstances when the mother's life and health is in danger, private health providers are more willing to provide abortion services but their services are unaffordable for most poorer Malaysians and migrant workers. The private health sector is also unregulated. Nadini Archer and Rashida Abdullah also report a reluctance among doctors and nurses, particularly in the public health sector, to perform abortions. There is also a misconception among medical professionals, the general public, and the media that abortion is illegal in Malaysia.

There is also limited access to medical abortion services in Malaysia. While mifepristone is not legally available in Malaysia, misoprostol is available as a prescribed drug. Some women have also sought information on abortion pills from online providers like "Women on the Web". In 2017, the Minister of Health Subramaniam Sathasivam called for the prosecution of anyone selling or purchasing medical abortion pills online. In response, the RRAAM argued that legalising medical abortion pills would curb the black market trade.

== Public opinion and activism ==
In 1974, a national fertility and family survey found that 71% percent of women supported abortions on the grounds of rape and incest, 54.3% supported abortion for unmarried women, 52.2% supported abortion for health reasons, and 34.5% supported abortion for economic and social reasons. However, there is still a strong social, religious, and cultural stigma against abortion in Malaysian society. According to Low et al., many medical professionals are unaware of abortion legislation in Malaysia. A study of Malaysian medical professionals sponsored by the United Nations Population Fund found that 59.2% of participants surveyed regarded abortion as taking a life, 43.4% opposed decriminalising abortion on demand, and that 26% refused to perform abortion on the basis of personal beliefs.

Pro-choice groups operating in Malaysia have included the Asia Safe Abortion Partnership (ASAP), the Asian-Pacific Resource and Research Centre for Women (ARROW), the Joint Action Group for Gender Equality (JAG) and the Reproductive Rights Advocacy Alliance Malaysia (RRAAM). Pro-choice groups have focused on lobbying the Malaysian Government into meeting its reproductive health obligations under the Convention on the Elimination of All Forms of Discrimination Against Women (CEDAW) and easing restrictions on medical abortion pills like mifepristone. The RRAAM was established in 2007 and worked with the Federation of Reproductive Health Association of Malaysia (FRHAM), women's NGOs, gynecologists, lawyers and feminist researchers to produce research centering women's perspectives on access to abortion in Malaysia. In 2009, a joint RRAAM–FRHAM report criticized the restricted access to abortion services in Malaysian hospitals.

Anti-abortion groups in Malaysia have included the Christian–based Pro-Life Group Kuching in Sarawak, which provides anti-abortion counselling, pregnancy care and shelter for expectant mothers, and organises talks, seminars, and public expos.

== Sources ==
- Archer, Nandini (June 2018). The law, trials and imprisonment for abortion in Malaysia (PDF) (Report). International Campaign for Women's Right to Safe Abortion.
- Low, Wah-Yun; Tong, Wen-Ting; Wong, Yut-Ling; Jegasothy, Ravindran; Choong, Sim-Poey (2015). "Access to Safe Legal Abortion in Malaysia: Women's Insights and Health Sector Response". Asia-Pacific Journal of Public Health. 27 (1): 33–37. doi:10.1177/1010539514562275. PMID 25452590. S2CID 9440038.
- Abdullah, Rashidah (2009). "Abortion in Malaysia: legal yet still inaccessible". Arrows for Change. 15 (2 & 3): 8–9.
- "Penal Code Act 574" (PDF). Parliament of Malaysia. 1 February 2018. Archived from the original (PDF) on 18 August 2019.
