= Marshall Medoff =

American economist (1945–2016)

Marshall Hilary Medoff (January 8, 1945 in Chicago, Illinois – February 14, 2016) was an American economist who taught at California State University, Long Beach (CSULB) and the University of California, Irvine.

== Education and career ==
Medoff received his B.S. from the Illinois Institute of Technology, his M.S. from the University of Illinois at Urbana-Champaign, and his Ph.D. from the University of California, Berkeley in 1973. He joined the faculty of CSULB in 1973, where he remained until he retired from there in 2012.

== Research ==
Medoff published studies on multiple disparate topics in the field of economics, including abortion restrictions, gun control laws, and racial discrimination.
