= Judith Blake (sociologist) =

American sociologist (1926–1993)

- Born: March 3, 1926; New York, New York, U.S.
- Died: April 29, 1993 (aged 67)
- Awards: William J. Goode Book Award (1990)

Academic background
- Education: Columbia University

Academic work
- Discipline: Demography
- Institutions: University of California, San Francisco; University of California, Berkeley; University of California, Los Angeles

Judith Kincade Blake (March 3, 1926 – April 29, 1993) was an American sociologist and demographer. She established the first Department of Demography, at the University of California, Berkeley and was the first holder of an endowed chair, at the University of California, Los Angeles.

Blake carried out one of the earliest surveys of fertility and population in a developing country, in Jamaica. In a 1956 publication, she identified a key concept now known as "proximate determinants of fertility", which became a basis for subsequent fertility analysis and policy design. For much of her career, Blake studied the demographics of families, using available secondary or national US data sets to examine contemporary population policy issues. She frequently challenged conventional wisdom, and emphasized that economic theories were insufficient to explain population shifts. Her book Family Size and Achievement (1989) won the American Sociological Association's William J. Goode Book Award in 1990.

== Life ==
Blake was born and raised in New York City. She was ill most of her life. She was raised by three generations of female family members, as her father went to work in California for most of her childhood.

== Career ==
Blake received a Bachelor of Science degree from Columbia University in 1951, and graduated magna cum laude. While at college, she became interested in social demography through a class taught by Hope Tisdale Eldridge. She also met Kingsley Davis, a demographer and professor of sociology. They married in 1954, had a daughter in 1959, and divorced in 1976.

While Blake was a graduate student, she worked as a research assistant at the Bureau of Applied Social Research at Columbia University. Her first publication was a monograph on cities, analyzing demographic data for the Air Force. Then the Conservation Foundation funded a project to examine birth rate and family structure in Jamaica, and Blake went to Jamaica as a research associate and co-director with of field research with J. Mayone Stycos. Her work was one of the earliest surveys on such a topic to be done in a developing country. Previous work in the field of population studies been done by Paul K. Hatt and Joe Stycos in Puerto Rico.

Blake moved to Berkeley, California in 1955. In 1956, she wrote an article entitled "Social Structure and Fertility: An Analytic Framework" with Kingsley Davis, which became a classic paper in her field. They identified what are now referred to as "proximate determinants of fertility", intermediate factors that immediately influence fertility, determining whether economic, social, and individual conditions will have the opportunity to affect fertility outcomes. Examples include the age at which partners engage in a union and both their intended and actual contraceptive use. The Davis-Blake intermediate variables provided a framework that is now routinely used in fertility analysis and policy design.

Blake worked as a lecturer at various institutions while completing her Ph.D. She taught first at the University of California, San Francisco, from 1957 to 1959, as a lecturer at the School of Nursing. She also taught at the University of California, Berkeley, as a lecturer in the Department of Sociology in 1957, and as a lecturer in the Department of Speech from 1961 to 1962. Blake later remarked that she felt that the university did not want female lecturers on staff.

In 1961, Blake received her PhD from Columbia University. Her thesis was published as Family Structure in Jamaica: The social context of reproduction (1961). She was one of the first researchers to study fertility in the context of the social structures surrounding it.

In 1962, Blake became an acting assistant professor of demography at the University of California, Berkeley School of Public Health. In 1965, she established a program in demography, which became the Department of Demography in 1967, with herself as chair. It was the first department of demography in the United States. The department trained a large amount of demographers working in the United States and abroad. When the department was closed in the 1970s, Blake moved briefly to Berkeley's School of Public Policy.

Blake spent much of her time studying the demographics of families in the United States, and challenging assumptions and theories through papers such as "Ideal family size among white Americans" (1966) and "Are babies consumer durables?" (1968). She examined attitudes and practices around birth control, finding similarities between Catholics and non-Catholics, and predicted a backlash in attitudes to abortion in "Abortion and Public Opinion" (1971).

Judith's presentation of these analyses continued to point out that child-bearing decisions are made within a web of familial relationships and motivations within a societal and institutional culture. The ramifications of these decisions have relevance for both the individual and the society. – Linda B. Bourque

In 1976, Blake was recruited to the University of California, Los Angeles, where she became the Fred H. Bixby Professor of Population Policy. Blake was the first holder of an endowed chair, and was appointed to both sociology and public health.

In 1981, Blake was elected president of the Population Association of America (PAA). She was made a fellow of the American Association for the Advancement of Science in 1982 and a fellow of the American Academy of Arts and Sciences in 1990.

Blake continued to study families, and observed significant differences in the educational levels and the number of children graduating in large vs. small families. Children from small families did better on an array of measures that she examined. Around 1980 she began to focus on no-child and single-child families. She concluded that single children were not worse off than those from two-children families. Blake published the book Family Size and Achievement in 1989. The book won the American Sociological Association's William J. Goode Book Award in 1990. Blake was also the editor of the Annual Review of Sociology from 1992 to 1993.

== Awards and honors ==
- 1990, William J. Goode Book Award, American Sociological Association

== Books ==
- Family Structure in Jamaica: The Social Context of Reproduction (1961)
- Family Size and Achievement (1989)
