= Potential person =

Entity capable of developing into a person

In philosophy and bioethics, potential (future) person (in plural, sometimes termed potential people) has been defined as an entity which is not currently a person but which is capable of developing into a person, given certain biologically and/or technically possible conditions. The term unconceived has also been used in a similar sense, but does not necessarily include the capability of being conceived or developing into a person.

== Definitions ==
In 1977, Canadian Philosopher Mary Anne Warren discussed various definitions for potential people. Most simply, a potential person could be defined as the currently existing genetic material that will constitute them, such as a sexually viable egg and sperm cell taken together, also when still being located in separate places. Potential people may also be defined from reproductive capability, which also includes the presence of other necessary factors for becoming a person, such as the availability of a womb to grow in, the will and means of parents to conceive, or even the care after birth to raise the individual into a complete sentient being. Thus the progression towards existence of a potential person usually lies mainly in the maturation of previous people to develop the will and ability to become potential parents.

In this sense, destroying sperm cells, for instance, does not significantly reduce the number of potential persons, because, provided the will and other means to conceive a person remains the same, there is still the possibility to extract the genetic information from remaining sperm cells or, theoretically, even from somatic cells such as skin cells (by somatic cell nuclear transfer). Actually, in this sense, for a man that intends to conceive only two children, the billions of sperm cells he produces throughout his lifetime may, taken together, still only be regarded as a contributing factor to a maximum of two potential persons.

If including the will to conceive as a necessary component of a potential person, the mere certain decision of a woman to not let an embryo grow inside her uterus may be regarded as sufficient to disqualify that embryo as a potential person, because a will that is strong enough would make that woman turn to even unsafe abortion, and a certain future abortion makes it certain that there won't be a necessary uterus for the embryo to grow inside to become a person.

Strangely, in such a view, an act of a woman in changing her mind from abortion to proceeding with the pregnancy may be regarded as creating a potential person rather than saving the life of one, but other views may be applied once the beginning of actual human personhood has been reached. When taking this view to a larger scale, a population that is very intent on reproducing can be expected to constitute a larger number of potential persons than a population refusing to reproduce, all other factors being equal. When there is only one or a few factors absent to constitute a potential person, that entity may still be termed "a potential person except for...", but the ensuing arguments from this may differ.

The people of the twenty-fifth century have been taken as an example of potential persons, because, although their particular gametes or embryos do not currently exist, there is reproductive capability of the currently living people and resources to make the future existence of those people possible. The mere likelihood of future existence is usually regarded as sufficient to apply the term, as there is a risk that, for example, the people of the twenty-fifth century will never exist because of an event of human extinction.

The beginning of human personhood, where a potential person is instead regarded as a proper person, is a concept currently debated by religion and philosophy. However, there could theoretically be no beginning of potential human personhood because it is dependent on the reproductive capability of the previous generation, which, in turn, is dependent on the reproductive capability of the generation before that etc. etc.

== Value of potential persons ==
It has been argued that the mere potential of becoming a person confers moral rights on a prima facie basis, or by holding that they are really in some sense actuals. On the other hand, there is the opinion that the potential itself is not of significance.

Among views that reject a prima facie right to potential people, there are, on one hand, claims that potential people are non-actuals and cannot be either benefited or harmed. Also, there are views that, although a potential person has no value in the present, the rightfulness of actions that we make today are still dependent on how they will affect such people in the future, and that we have moral obligations for future generations. An argument for such a view is in finding it logical that the value of an action can be seen as equivalent to the total instrumental value at any time of the chain of events that that action started, which in turn can be seen as equivalent to the total intrinsic value of whatever ends-in-themselves are generated or benefited at the end of that chain of events. For example, a remote friend has a baby, and is about to conceive another, and, for example, happiness is taken as the end-in-itself and receiving a toy is taken as an instrument to it, then, the yet unconceived baby may not be regarded as currently having ethic value, in contrast to the existing baby, but nevertheless, the instrumental value in the action of posting a toy to either of them can be regarded as equivalent, because either alternative would generate equal amount of intrinsic value in the form of happiness in the future, with some modification for, for example, the risk of failing to conceive again, and the burden for the post office or parent in storing the toy until, at least, birth. In such a view, it is uncertain to which extent a lesser probability of becoming a person affects the moral value of that potential person, putting uncertainty to claiming, for example, that a potential person with 50% probability of becoming a person should be treated as having 50% the value of an actual person.

=== Bringing people into existence ===
Even among views that the rightfulness of current actions depend on how they will affect yet non-existent people, there may still be differences regarding the justification of bringing people into existence in the first place, or the prevention of it.

A major factor in this issue is whether ends-in-themselves are generally regarded to optimally be maximized or minimized on a total basis or as an average among the people (such as, for example, total versus average utilitarism). A view that favors maximizing an end-in-itself on a total basis may consider it beneficial to have more people brought into existence by the motivation that there are more people to generate it. On the other hand, a view that favors maximizing an end-in-itself on an average basis has suggested that the benefit or harm in an action that supports or prevents bringing a potential person into existence depends on whether that person, on average, will constitute or generate more or less end-in-itself than the average. For example, if happiness is regarded as the end-in-itself, then, it has been claimed to be morally objectionable to bring a potential person into existence that is predicted to be very unhappy.

Another factor that has been suggested is the possible positive or negative value of nonexistence, which can be regarded as weighting against or adding to the values of existence when considering the rightfulness of bringing potential people into existence.

==== Practical consequences ====
The personal opinion on the value of bringing potential people into existence may be a major factor in many issues, including:

- Natalism (promoting human reproduction) or antinatalism
- Issues of optimum population, overpopulation, or population decline
- Pro-choice or pro-life

From a view that favors the act of bringing people into existence, it has been argued that avoidance from conceiving a child when there are prerequisites for raising it is comparable to causing the death of one. Also, it has been argued that contraception, and even the decision not to procreate at all could be regarded as immoral on a similar basis as abortion. However, holding value in potential persons does not necessarily decrease support for abortion rights. It has been regarded as justified to induce abortion of a severely disabled fetus in favor for conceiving a new child. However, a major reason that has been given to be cautious about performing abortion with such motivation is the fact that the likelihood of successfully bringing the new child into existence is substantially lower, as the parents may separate, one of them may become sterile, or they may change their minds about having children. A comparable situation is the abortion of an unintended pregnancy in favor for conceiving a new child later in better conditions.

== See also ==
- Preformationism
- Spiritual evolution
- Epigenesis (biology)
- Potentiality and actuality
- Physicalism
- Philosophy of mind
- Presentism (philosophy of time)
