= James F. Thomson (philosopher) =

British philosopher (1921–1984)

- Born: James Frederick Thomson; 22 June 1921; Hammersmith, London, England
- Died: 15 February 1984 (aged 62)
- Spouse: Judith Jarvis Thomson (m. 1962; div. 1980)

Education
- Education: University of London

Philosophical work
- Era: 20th-century philosophy
- Region: Western philosophy
- School: Analytic philosophy
- Institutions: University College London; University of Cambridge; University of Oxford; Columbia University; Massachusetts Institute of Technology
- Main interests: Ethics, logic, metaphysics, philosophy of language, philosophy of mathematics
- Notable ideas: Thomson's lamp; Supertasks

James Frederick Thomson (22 June 1921 – 15 February 1984) was a British philosopher who devised the puzzle of Thomson's lamp, to argue against the possibility of supertasks (a term he also coined)

== Academic career ==
Thomson was born in Hammersmith, London in 1921 and graduated from the University of London in 1949. He was an assistant in the Department of Philosophy and John Stuart Mill Scholar at University College, London, from 1949–1950. He was a Commonwealth Fund Fellow at Harvard and Princeton from 1950–1951; assistant lecturer at University College from 1951–1953 and University Lecturer in Moral Science at the University of Cambridge from 1953–1956. Thomson was appointed Fellow and Tutor in Philosophy, Corpus Christi College, Oxford, in 1956, and also University Lecturer at Columbia University. He was visiting professor at Columbia from 1961–1962, and in 1963 he was appointed professor of philosophy at MIT.

== Family life ==
In 1962, he married the American philosopher Judith Jarvis Thomson. They separated in 1976 and divorced in 1980; they remained colleagues until James Thomson’s death in 1984.

== Thomson's lamp ==
In a seminal 1954 article which followed on from the work of Max Black, Thomson considered the successful completion of an infinite number of tasks within a given time, to which he gave the name supertasks.

To disprove the possibility of supertasks, he introduced Thomson's lamp, a thought experiment similar to Zeno's paradoxes. This problem involves the mathematical summation of an infinite divergent series such as Grandi's.

A lamp (which may be on or off at the start of the thought-experiment) is flicked on and off an infinite number of times within a 2-minute period. This corresponds to the ordered sequence t=0, t=0.5, t=0.75, t=0.875, ...

According to Thomson, although the lamp must be either on or off at the end of the experiment when t=1, the state of the lamp – after an infinite number of switches – is also completely undetermined (i.e. the sequence has no limit). This apparent contradiction led him to reject the possibility of the experiment, and therefore the possibility of supertasks.

However, Paul Benacerraf in a 1962 paper successfully criticised Thomson's argument by pointing out that the states of the lamp during the experiment do not logically determine the final state of the lamp when t=1. Thomson's conditions for the experiment are insufficiently complete, since only instants of time before t≡1 are considered. Benacerraf's essay led to a renewed interest in infinity-related problems, set theory and the foundation of supertask theory.

== Selected bibliography ==
- A note on truth. Analysis, 1949
- The argument from analogy and our knowledge of other minds. Mind, 1951
- Some Remarks on Synonymy. Analysis, 1952
- Symposium: Reducibility. (with Warnock, G. J. and Braithwaite, R. B.) Aristotelian Society, 1952
- On Referring. The Journal of Symbolic Logic, 1953
- Tasks and super-tasks. Analysis, 1954
- Recent Criticisms of Russell's Analysis of Existence. The Journal of Symbolic Logic, 1956
- What Achilles should have said to the Tortoise. Ratio, 1960
- On some paradoxes. Analytical Philosophy, 1962
- Is existence a predicate? Aquinas Society, 1963
- What is the will? in Freedom and the Will (ed Pears, D.F.) New York: St. Martin's Press, 1963
- In defense of material implication. Journal of Philosophy, 1966
- Truth-bearers and the Trouble about Propositions. The Journal of Philosophy, 1969
- Comments on Professor Benacerraf's Paper in Zeno's Paradoxes (ed. Salmon, W.), Bobbs-Merrill, 1970
- In Defense of ⊃. (1963/4) The Journal of Philosophy, 1990 (posth.)

== See also ==
- British philosophy
- Ross–Littlewood paradox
- Zeno machine
