= A Defense of Abortion =

1971 ethics essay by Judith Jarvis Thomson

"A Defense of Abortion" is a moral philosophy essay by Judith Jarvis Thomson first published in Philosophy & Public Affairs in 1971. Granting for the sake of argument that the fetus has a right to life, Thomson uses thought experiments to argue that the right to life does not include, entail, or imply the right to use someone else's body to survive and that induced abortion is therefore morally permissible. Thomson's argument has critics on both sides of the abortion debate, but it continues to receive defense. Despite criticism, "A Defense of Abortion" remains highly influential.

== Overview ==
=== Violinist – the "Use of someone else's body." ===
In "A Defense of Abortion", Thomson grants for the sake of argument that the fetus has a right to life but defends the permissibility of abortion by appealing to a thought experiment. She writes:

You wake up in the morning and find yourself back to back in bed with an unconscious violinist. A famous unconscious violinist. He has been found to have a fatal kidney ailment, and the Society of Music Lovers has canvassed all the available medical records and found that you alone have the right blood type to help. They have therefore kidnapped you, and last night the violinist's circulatory system was plugged into yours, so that your kidneys can be used to extract poisons from his blood as well as your own. [If he is unplugged from you now, he will die; but in nine months] he will have recovered from his ailment, and can safely be unplugged from you.

Thomson argues that one can permissibly unplug oneself from the violinist even though this will cause his death; this is due to limits on the right to life, which does not include the right to use another person's body, and so by unplugging the violinist one does not violate his right to life but merely deprives him of something – the use of someone else's body – to which he has no right. She argues: "[I]f you do allow him to go on using your kidneys, this is a kindness on your part, and not something he can claim from you as his due." For the same reason, Thomson says that abortion does not violate the fetus's legitimate right to life but merely deprives the fetus of something – the non-consensual use of the pregnant woman's body and life-supporting functions – to which it has no right. Thus, by choosing to terminate her pregnancy, Thomson concludes that a pregnant woman does not normally violate the fetus's right to life but merely withdraws its use of her own body, which usually causes the fetus to die.

=== Third-party participation – the "expanding child" ===
Thomson criticizes the common method of deducing a woman's right to abort from the permissibility of a third party committing the abortion. In most instances, a woman's right to abortion may hinge on the doctor's willingness to perform it. If the doctor refuses, then the pregnant woman is denied her right. To base the pregnant woman's right on the accordance or refusal of a doctor, she argues that it is to ignore the pregnant woman's full personhood and subsequently her right to her own body. Thomson presents the hypothetical example of the expanding child. She writes:

Suppose you find yourself trapped in a tiny house with a growing child. I mean a very tiny house and a rapidly growing child – you are already up against the wall of the house and in a few minutes you'll be crushed to death. The child on the other hand won't be crushed to death; if nothing is done to stop him from growing he'll be hurt, but in the end, he'll simply burst open the house and walk out a free man.

Thomson concedes that a third party cannot make the choice to kill either the person being crushed or the child but argues that this does not mean the person being crushed cannot act in self-defense and attack the child to save his or her own life. To liken this to pregnancy, the mother can be thought to be the person inside the house and the fetus to be the growing child. In such a case, the mother's life is being threatened, and the fetus is the one who threatens it. Because for no reason should the pregnant woman's life be threatened and also for no reason is the fetus threatening it, both are innocent and thus no third party can intervene. Thomson asserts that the person threatened can intervene, by which justification a mother can rightfully abort. Returning to the expanding child example, she argues:

For what we have to keep in mind is that the mother and the unborn child are not like two tenants in a small house, which has, by unfortunate mistake, been rented to both: the mother owns [italics in original] the house. The fact that she does adds to the offensiveness of deducing that the mother can do nothing from the supposition that third parties can do nothing. But it does more than this: it casts a bright light on the supposition that third parties can do nothing.

If one says that no one may help the mother obtain an abortion, this is a failure to acknowledge her right over her own body or property. Thomson says that one is not personally obligated to help the pregnant woman, although this does not rule out the possibility that someone else may act. Thomson reminds that the house belongs to the pregnant woman; similarly, the body which holds a fetus also belongs to her.

=== Pregnancy resulting from voluntary intercourse – "people-seeds" ===
To illustrate an example of pregnancy due to voluntary intercourse, Thomson presents the people-seeds situation. She writes:

Again, suppose it were like this: people-seeds drift about in the air like pollen, and if you open your windows, one may drift in and take root in your carpets or upholstery. You don't want children, so you fix up your windows with fine mesh screens, the very best you can buy. As can happen, however, and on very, very rare occasions does happen, one of the screens is defective; and a seed drifts in and takes root.

In this example, the people-seeds flying through the window represent conception, despite the precautionary mesh screen, which functions as contraception. The woman in question does not want a people-seed to root itself in her house, and so she takes the necessary precautions and measures to protect herself with the best mesh screens and then voluntarily opens the windows. In the event that a single people-seed finds its way through the window screens, unwelcome as it may be, Thomson asks whether the simple fact that the woman knowingly risked such an occurrence when opening her window deny her the ability to rid her house of the intruder. She observes that some may argue the affirmative to this question, stating: "After all you could have lived out your life with bare floors and furniture, or with sealed windows and doors." Thomson responds that in following this logic any woman could avoid pregnancy from rape by simply having a hysterectomy – an extreme procedure simply to safeguard against such a possibility. Thomson concludes that although there may be times when the fetus has a right to the pregnant woman's body, it does not have a right to her body in most cases. This analogy raises the issue of whether all abortions are unjust killing.

=== Caveats ===
Thomson does not support abortion in all circumstances, and she gives as an example a hypothetical woman who seeks a late termination of pregnancy "just to avoid the nuisance of postponing a trip abroad", and declares this to be "positively indecent". Thomson also explicitly rejects the claim that pregnant women have a right to kill their offspring. She argues for the right of the pregnant woman to stop being pregnant even if this results in the death of the offspring but not for the right to ensure that the offspring is dead. For example, if a late-term abortion accidentally results in the birth of a living baby, then Thomson would conclude that the mother has no right to kill the baby.

== Responses ==
By positing a moral justification for abortion even if one grants a fetal right to life, Thomson's article opened up a new avenue in the philosophical debate about the ethics of abortion. Critics of her view have formulated many objections to her argument, and defenders have responded in kind in a back-and-forth that continues in philosophy journals. Thomson's imaginative examples and controversial conclusions have made "A Defense of Abortion" perhaps "the most widely reprinted essay in all of contemporary philosophy". Critics of Thomson's argument generally grant the permissibility of unplugging the violinist but seek to block the inference that abortion is permissible by arguing that there are morally relevant differences between the violinist scenario and typical cases of abortion. One notable exception to this general agreement is Peter Singer, who argues that, despite human intuitions, a utilitarian calculus implies that one is morally obliged to stay connected to the violinist. Thomson observes that the woman's right to abortion does not include the right to directly insist upon the death of the child should the fetus happen to be viable, that is, capable of surviving outside the womb. She writes: "All the same, I agree that the desire for the child's death is not one which anybody may gratify, should it turn out to be possible to detach the child alive."

The most common objection is that Thomson's violinist argument can justify abortion only in cases of rape, although Thomson uses separate analogies to argue in cases other than rape. In the violinist scenario, the pregnant woman was kidnapped; she did not consent to having the violinist plugged into her and she did nothing to cause the violinist to be plugged in, just as a woman who is pregnant due to rape did nothing to cause the pregnancy. In some cases of abortion, the pregnant woman had voluntary intercourse, and thus has either tacitly consented to allow the fetus to use her body (the tacit consent objection), or else has a duty to sustain the fetus because the pregnant woman herself caused the fetus to stand in need of her body (the responsibility objection). Other common objections turn on the claim that the fetus is the pregnant woman's child, whereas the violinist is a stranger (the stranger versus offspring objection), or that abortion directly and intentionally kills the fetus, whereas unplugging the violinist merely lets him die of natural causes (the killing versus letting die objection). Defenders of Thomson's argument reply that the alleged disanalogies between the violinist scenario and typical cases of abortion do not matter, either because the factors that critics appeal to are not genuinely morally relevant, or because those factors are morally relevant but do not apply to abortion in the way that critics have claimed. Thomson's defenders also point to her people-seeds argument as a strong analogy to typical cases of abortion.

== See also ==
- Philosophical aspects of the abortion debate – for more detail about how this debate has progressed beyond Thomson's article

== Bibliography ==
- Abbott, Philip (1978). "Philosophers and the Abortion Question". Political Theory. 6 (3): 313–335. doi:10.1177/009059177800600304. ISSN 0090-5917. JSTOR 190808.
- Beckwith, Francis J. (1993). Politically Correct Death: Answering the Arguments for Abortion Rights. Grand Rapids, Michigan: Baker Books.
- Boonin, David (2003). A Defense of Abortion. Cambridge: Cambridge University Press.
- Cain, Patricia; Love, Jean (1 May 1988). "Stories of Rights: Developing Moral Theory and Teaching Law". Michigan Law Review. 86 (6): 1365–1387. doi:10.2307/1289185. ISSN 0026-2234. JSTOR 1289185.
- Griffith, Steven (1985). "How Not to Argue About Abortion". Philosophy Research Archives. 11: 347–354. doi:10.5840/pra19851119.
- Johnson, Nicholas (1 January 1997). "Principles and Passions: The Intersection of Abortion and Gun Rights". Rutgers L. Rev. 50: 97–197.
- Kamm, F. M. (1992). Creation and Abortion: A Study in Moral and Legal Philosophy. New York: Oxford University Press.
- Lee, Patrick (1996). Abortion and Unborn Human Life. Washington: Catholic University of America Press. ISBN 978-0813208466.
- Manninen, Bertha Alvarez (2013). "Yes, the Baby Should Live: A Pro-Choice Response to Giubilini and Minerva". Journal of Medical Ethics. 39 (5): 330–335. doi:10.1136/medethics-2012-100656. ISSN 0306-6800. JSTOR 43282725. PMID 23637447.
- McMahan, Jeff (2002). The Ethics of Killing: Problems at the Margins of Life. New York: Oxford University Press.
- Moran, Rosalind (3 April 2023). "Artificial Wombs Will Change Abortion Rights Forever". Wired. ISSN 1059-1028. Archived from the original on 16 April 2024.
- Parent, William (1986). "Editor's Preface". Rights, Restitution, and Risk: Essays in Moral Theory. By Thomson, Judith Jarvis. Parent, William (ed.). Cambridge, Massachusetts: Harvard University Press. pp. vii–x. ISBN 978-0-674-76980-9.
- Pavlischek, Keith J. (1993). "Abortion Logic and Paternal Responsibilities: One More Look at Judith Thomson's 'A Defense of Abortion'". Public Affairs Quarterly. 7 (4): 341–361. ISSN 0887-0373. JSTOR 40435859.
- Schwarz, Stephen D. (1990). The Moral Question of Abortion. Chicago: Loyola University Press. ISBN 978-0829406238.
- Silverstein, Harry S. (1987). "On a Woman's 'Responsibility' for the Fetus". Social Theory and Practice. 13 (1): 103–119. doi:10.5840/soctheorpract19871319. ISSN 0037-802X. JSTOR 23560286. PMID 11655870.
- Singer, Peter (2011). Practical Ethics (3rd ed.). New York: Cambridge University Press.
- Steinbock, Bonnie (1992). Life Before Birth: The Moral and Legal Status of Embryos and Fetuses. Oxford: Oxford University Press.
- Thomson, Judith Jarvis (1971). "A Defense of Abortion". Philosophy and Public Affairs. 1 (1): 47–66. ISSN 1088-4963. JSTOR 2265091.
- Tooley, Michael (1972). "Abortion and Infanticide". Philosophy & Public Affairs. 2 (1): 37–65. ISSN 1088-4963. JSTOR 2264919.
- Warren, Mary Anne (1973). "On the Moral and Legal Status of Abortion". The Monist. 57 (1): 43–61. doi:10.5840/monist197357133. ISSN 2153-3601. JSTOR 27902294. PMID 11661013.
