= Departurism =

Libertarian perspective on abortion

Departurism is an anti-abortion libertarian philosophy developed by American philosopher Sean Parr which argues, contrary to evictionism, that the lethal removal of an unwanted embryo or fetus ought to be legally impermissible (except in cases where the pregnancy jeopardizes the life of the mother).

Unlike the traditional pro-life vs. pro-choice dichotomy, both departurism and its libertarian counterpoint, evictionism

address the challenges posed by emerging reproductive technologies—such as artificial wombs, fetal transfer, and gestational outsourcing.... In a transhumanist future where pregnancy may be safely ended without ending fetal life.... these frameworks may provide the jurisprudential scaffolding for abortion law.

== Commonalities with evictionism ==
Both departurism and evictionism acknowledge "the complex ethical questions surrounding abortion, particularly the tension between fetal moral status and a pregnant person's bodily autonomy." Regarding the moral status of fetal life, both frameworks view the fetus as a distinct, living human being and, further, admit his personhood.

Further, both frameworks recognize the mother's autonomy over her own body. To this end, there are two aspects of these theories that make them uniquely libertarian:

1. They view the abortion issue through the lens of property rights, allowing that an unwanted fetus is to a mother what a trespasser is to the owner of the property in question.
2. They conceptually separate abortion into (a) the removal of the child from the womb and (b) the resultant death of the child. Abortion, thus, is understood as lethal eviction. Both theories generally view the act of eviction as broadly justifiable on its own, while justification for abortion in its entirety is more limited and specific, varying for different reasons and to different extents.

Moreover, both theories argue that the fetus lacks mens rea in his occupation of the mother's womb, so the mother's treatment of the fetus must follow the principle of gentleness.

=== Gentleness ===
Gentleness is an ex ante element of law—similar to the ex post element, proportionality—which states that if the victim of an invasion intends to halt it while it is occurring, they must only use the least severe measures necessary to do so. Failing to use the gentlest means possible to end non-criminal aggression, places the victim "at risk of falling on the wrong side of the non-aggression principle," violating it "to a far greater extent than is the trespasser." Because all fetuses "are equally innocent," this attempt to curtail property owners from dealing with such trespassers "more severely than libertarian punishment theory allows" is applicable to unwanted fetuses who are the result of rape no less than those whom are consensually conceived.

== Conflict with evictionism ==
Where departurism and evictionism differ is in their understanding of what gentleness ought to look like when it is properly applied to situations of trespass within the womb.

The evictionist view is that the mother may not directly kill the unwanted child (e.g., initiate a medical abortion, non-lethally evict the child and then kill him, etc.), but she may indirectly do so by evicting him from her premises during a time in which he is non-viable outside the womb. This lethal eviction however, if it's to be in accord with gentleness, must proceed only after the relevant authorities have been notified to see if they are able and willing to prevent this removal from becoming fatal.

Departurism, likewise, holds that the mother may evict but not directly kill the trespassing fetus, but, contrary to evictionism, neither may she kill him by eviction. The mother, if her actions are to conform to gentleness, must allow for the continued departure of the trespasser until such time that eviction no longer entails his death. That is, "it is only the lethal (or otherwise debilitating) eviction of a fetus during a normal pregnancy that departurism views as discordant with gentleness and, thus, a violation of the NAP."

Because the requirements of both views (evictionism's notification and departurism's continued departure) are said to find their justification in gentleness, it is the view whose requirement best conforms to this principle that should be preferable on libertarian grounds.

== The departurist argument ==
The departurist argument is an attempt to

- take into account the unique characteristics of an unwanted pregnancy in order to avoid unnuanced comparisons which liken womb-aged children to ordinary, criminal trespassers; and
- show the NAP-preserving gentleness principle to be the lens through which libertarians properly discern this issue.

First, the departurist argument compares two situations, S_{1} and S_{2}.

S_{1} represents the situation of a trespasser who is (a) unable to engage in human action and (b) leaving the premises of the property owner, while (c) not endangering the life of the same, and where (d) the eviction of this trespasser will result in his death. S_{2} represents the situation of an unwanted fetus in the uterus of his mother.

Departurism claims that these situations are relevantly similar to each other and therefore cannot be treated differently. That is, the requirement of practical consistency dictates that the same course of action is appropriate in both situations.

Second, the departurist argument describes a course of action, A.

A represents the course of action in which the property owner allows for the trespasser to continue his departure until such time that eviction will not necessitate his death.

Departurism claims that this course of action stops the trespass in a comparatively less harmful manner than does the course of action advanced by evictionism (e.g., it doesn't entail that the inadvertent aggressor be subjected to unjustifiable life-taking or NAP-violating violence). That is, the principle of gentleness dictates that this course of action is the correct, libertarian one in either case.

1. The course of action that libertarian legal theory ought to endorse in S_{1} is A.
2. S_{2} is relevantly similar to S_{1}.
3. Therefore, the course of action that libertarian legal theory ought to endorse in S_{2} is A.

=== Premise one ===
Departurism illustrates a potential expression of S_{1} which includes all of its relevant conditions (a-d). This illustration posits a property, owned by M and on which F is trespassing, which abuts a cliff on its southern border. F, whose mental state or capacity is such that he is incapable of knowing that he is trespassing, is travelling along this cliffside from west to east and off of M's property (that is, unwitting F happens to be vacating the premises). Importantly, there is nothing about F's trespass which is seriously endangering M's life. M knows that should F be pushed off the cliff while on the western end of the premises (the black area), F will certainly die due to the severe height of the fall. Further, M is aware that a fall from the eastern end of the premises (the white area) will not prove fatal for F due to the negligible distance from the cliffside to ground below. A fall from in between these ends (the gray area) may or may not be deadly. According to departurism,

whether or not a fall from the gray area is fatal depends on the technology available at the time to prevent it from becoming so. To wit, 1000 years ago the gray area would have been all black; 1000 years from now, with technological advances, the gray area will be all white. Currently, falls from the gray area are more likely to result in death and serious injury the closer they are to the black area, and less likely to result in the same the closer they are to the white area.

Departurism makes the case that the evictionist-proposed course of action (that M may legally shove F headlong off the cliff and unto the black or western gray areas) is not transformed into a less harsh means of ending the trespass simply because the evictionist notification requirement has first been satisfied (e.g., someone was told about this fatal cliff-tossing beforehand). The departurist indictment goes on to state that this evictionist position represents "nothing if not a textbook example of the very response on the part of the victim that gentleness was placed into libertarian law so as to preclude." Moreover, the supposed gentleness of evictionism falls short when compared to the departurist-proposed course of action (that M be prohibited from evicting F unto the black or western gray areas when so doing constitutes a degree of severity inappropriate for bringing an end to this particular trespass).

=== Premise two ===
Evictionism concedes that the following conditions of S_{1} are present in S_{2}:

(a) The trespasser is incapable of purposeful behavior.

(b) The trespasser is in the process of departing the property owner's premises.

Although the evictionist has made no quarrel with either of these points, departurism has elucidated how the latter condition relates to S_{2} in the following way:

It can be assumed that every pregnancy begins at the western end of M's premises. From fertilization to parturition, the process of gestation takes the fetus from the western to the eastern end (and off) of M's premises. The fetus, as a matter of fact, is departing the premises of the property owner and he is so doing from the moment that he first arrives there—regardless of the point at which he is deemed a trespasser.

Furthermore, evictionism does not dispute the presence in S_{2} of the remaining conditions of S_{1}—as these conditions represent, respectively, the most prevalent and the most relevant instances of uterine trespass:

(c) The trespasser is not jeopardizing the proprietor's life via aggression against property rights in the person.

(d) The trespasser's eviction from said premises would necessitate his death.

=== Premise three ===
Practical consistency prohibits the trespasser in S_{2} from being treated differently from the trespasser in S_{1} because all of the relevant conditions of the latter situation are found also in the former. It is for this reason that departurism holds that

just as it ought to be illicit for M to send F fatally off into the wild blue yonder, it ought also to be illicit for a mother to kill, or otherwise unjustifiably maim, the unwanted fetus in her womb by eviction.

== Criticism of evictionism ==
=== From gentleness ===
Departurism charges evictionism with radically conceiving of the gentleness principle not as the least harmful manner possible consistent with stopping the aggression, but as the most expedient manner possible consistent with stopping the aggressor. The departurist claim is that this comprehension destroys the spirit or intended purpose of the gentleness principle by twisting it in order to permit victims of non-criminal aggression to engage in severe reactions and over-responses—the very things which are the principle's purpose to prohibit.

=== From positive obligation ===
Both evictionism and departurism contain requirements that the mother withhold the eviction of the unwanted child for some amount of time. For the former, that amount of time is the duration required for the mother's notification of the authorities; for the latter, it is the duration required for the child's continued departure to reach the point at which his eviction no longer necessitates a NAP-violation. The departurist claim is that the evictionist notification requirement constitutes a positive obligation, and so is anathema to libertarianism. Evictionism's requirement, unlike departurism's, is a positive one because it neither derives from nor constitutes the gentlest manner possible of bringing the fetal trespass to an end.

=== From duration ===
It is the departurist view that evictionism transforms libertarianism into an ideology of squatters by means of its positive obligation that the mother notify the authorities prior to her lethal eviction of the fetus. The departurist claim is that this permits the fetus to occupy the mother's premises, without her permission, for the duration of that notification.

Departurism further holds that evictionism transforms libertarianism into an ideology of corpses. The evictionist view is that because the trespasser in this case cannot engage in purposeful behavior, the phenomenon of implicit contracts is impotent to prevent his lethal eviction from the mother's uterus (even if the duration of his trespass is not onerous). But womb-aged children are not the only category of persons to whom it can be argued that implicit contracts are not applicable. The departurist claim is that, under evictionism, any guest who is mentally or developmentally incapable of entering into a contract may have his invitation rescinded by his host at any time, and this newly-designated "trespasser" can then be lethally and lawfully removed from the premises. The evictionist has not balked at this characterization of his view, stating that the departurist makes a "not totally unreasonable point." The evictionist has even gone on to concede that this "of course sounds horrible," before attempting to justify it on consequentialist grounds.

== Detractors ==
Walter Block has made counter-arguments to departurism.

== See also ==
- Debates within libertarianism
- Evictionism
- Libertarian perspectives on abortion
- Non-aggression principle
- Philosophical aspects of the abortion debate
