= Libertarians for Life =

Nonsectarian group

Libertarians for Life (LFL, L4L) is a nonsectarian group expressing an opposition to abortion within the context of libertarianism. Based in Wheaton, Maryland, Libertarians for Life believes abortion is not a right, but "a wrong under justice".

== Views ==
To explain and defend its stance on abortion, Libertarians for Life argues that:

1. Human offspring are human beings, persons from fertilization.
2. Abortion is homicide – the killing of one person by another.
3. There is never a right to kill an innocent person. Prenatally, we are all innocent persons.
4. A prenatal child has the right to be in the mother's body. Parents have no right to evict their children from the crib or from the womb and let them die. Instead both parents, the father as well as the mother, owe them support and protection from harm.
5. No government, nor any individual, has a just power to legally "de-person" any one of us, born or preborn.
6. The proper purpose of the law is to side with the innocent, not against them.

None of the arguments are based upon religious belief, and are intended to appeal equally to atheists and theists. This is a point of pride for the group, claiming to rely on science and reason, while both anti-abortion allies and abortion rights opponents use what they view as non-scientific or unreasoned arguments.

== Activities ==
Doris Gordon founded Libertarians for Life in 1976 "because some libertarian had to blow the whistle." In 1988, the Libertarians for Life unsuccessfully attempted to change the Libertarian Party position on abortion, so it would be similar to the party's 1988 presidential nominee, Ron Paul.

== See also ==
- Abortion debate
  - Philosophical aspects of the abortion debate
- Abortion law
- Debates within libertarianism
- Democrats for Life of America
- Factions in the U.S. Libertarian Party
- Fetal and children's rights
- Libertarian perspectives on abortion
- Libertarian theories of law
- Natural and legal rights
- Opposition to legal abortion
- Republican National Coalition for Life
- Support for legal abortion
- United States pro-life movement
