= Philosophical aspects of the abortion debate =

The philosophical aspects of the abortion debate are logical arguments that can be made either in support of or in opposition to abortion. The philosophical arguments in the abortion debate are deontological or rights-based. The view that all or almost all abortion should be illegal generally rests on the claims that (1) the existence and moral right to life of human beings (human organisms) begins at or near conception-fertilization; that (2) induced abortion is the deliberate and unjust killing of the embryo in violation of its right to life; and that (3) the law should prohibit unjust violations of the right to life. The view that abortion should in most or all circumstances be legal generally rests on the claims that (1) women have a right to control what happens in and to their own bodies; that (2) abortion is a just exercise of this right; and that (3) the law should not criminalize just exercises of the right to control one's own body and its life-support functions.

Although both sides are likely to see the rights-based considerations as paramount, some popular arguments appeal to consequentialist or utilitarian considerations. For example, anti-abortion groups sometimes cite alleged medical and psychological risks of abortion, such as the existence of post-abortion syndrome or the abortion–breast cancer hypothesis. On the other side, abortion-rights groups say that criminalizing abortion will lead to the deaths of many women through "back-alley abortions", that unwanted children have a negative social impact, or conversely cite the legalized abortion and crime effect, and that reproductive rights are necessary to achieve the full and equal participation of women in society and the workforce. Consequentialist arguments on both sides tend to be vigorously disputed, although they are not widely discussed in the philosophical literature.

Contemporary philosophical literature contains two kinds of arguments concerning the morality of abortion. One family of arguments relates to the moral status of the embryo—whether or not the embryo has a right to life, in other words whether the embryo is a person in a moral sense. An affirmative answer would support the (1) claim in the central anti-abortion argument, while a negative answer would support the (1) claim in the central abortion-rights argument. Another family of arguments relates to bodily rights—the question of whether the woman's bodily rights justify abortion even if the embryo has a right to life. A negative answer would support claim the (2) claim in the central anti-abortion argument, while an affirmative answer would support the (2) claim in the central abortion-rights argument.

== Philosophical argumentation on the moral issue ==
=== Arguments based on criteria for personhood ===
Since there is a continuous progression from zygote to embryo to fetus to baby, questioning the beginning of personhood could lead to an instance of the sorites paradox, also known as the paradox of the heap. Mary Anne Warren, in her article arguing for the permissibility of abortion, holds that moral opposition to abortion is based on the following argument:

1. It is wrong to kill innocent human beings.
2. The embryo is an innocent human being.
3. Hence it is wrong to kill the embryo.

Warren thinks that "human being" is used in different senses in (1) and (2). In (1), "human being" is used in a moral sense to mean a "person", a "full-fledged member of the moral community". In (2), "human being" means "biological human". Warrens holds that while the embryo being a biologically human organism or animal is uncontroversial, it does not follow that the embryo is a person, and it is persons that have rights, such as the right to life. To help make a distinction between "person" and "biological human", Warren observes that humans should respect the lives of highly intelligent aliens even if they are not biological humans. She thinks there is a cluster of properties that characterize persons:

1. Consciousness of objects and events external and/or internal to the being, and in particular the capacity to feel pain.
2. Reasoning, the developed capacity to solve new and relatively complex problems.
3. Self-motivated activity, which is relatively independent of either genetic or direct external control.
4. The capacity to communicate, by whatever means, messages of an indefinite variety of types, that is, not just with an indefinite number of possible contents but on indefinitely many possible topics.
5. The presence of self-concepts, and self-awareness, either individual or racial, or both.

A person does not have to have each of these but if something has all five, then it definitely is a person whether it is biologically human or not, while if it has none or perhaps only one, then it is not a person, whether it is biologically human or not. The fetus has at most one, consciousness and this only after it becomes susceptible to pain—the timing of which is disputed, and hence is not a person. Other writers apply similar criteria, concluding that the embryo lacks a right to life because it lacks self-consciousness, or rationality and self-consciousness, or "certain higher psychological capacities" including "autonomy". Others conclude that personhood should be based on the brain birth concept, which is in essence the reversal of the brain death used as a modern definition of medical death. Under this proposal, presence of brain waves would be enough to grant personhood, even with other features lacking. Based on whether brain activity in the brain stem, or just in the cerebral cortex, is relevant for personhood, two concepts of brain birth emerge, namely at the first appearance of brain waves in lower brain (brain stem), or about 6–8 weeks of gestation (paralleling "whole brain death"), and at the first appearance of brain waves in higher brain (cerebral cortex), or about 22–24 or 24–28 weeks of gestation (paralleling "higher brain death"). Different writers place brain birth at numerous points, from as early as 25–40 days to as high as 32–36 weeks, with 8 weeks and 22–24 weeks as alternatives. For other writers, the concept itself is open to question. For example, a 1989 review of previous discussions of the concept, which placed brain birth at various points between 12 days' and 20 weeks' gestation and emphasized the symmetry of brain birth and brain death, concluded that "if the concept of brain birth is a valid one, it should be placed at 24–28 weeks' gestation. More importantly, it is concluded that the differences between brain development and brain death throw doubt on the concept itself."

Although these writers disagree on precisely which features confer a right to life, they agree those features must be certain developed psychological or physiological features which the embryo lacks. Warren's arguments face two main objections. The comatose patient objection claims that as patients in a reversible coma do not satisfy Warren's or some other criteria—they are not conscious, do not communicate, and so on—therefore they would lack a right to life on her view. One response is that "although the reversibly comatose lack any conscious mental states, they do retain all their unconscious [or dispositional] mental states, since the appropriate neurological configurations are preserved in the brain." This may allow them to satisfy some of Warren's criteria. The comatose also still possess brain activity (brain waves), so this objection does not apply to brain birth theories. Finally, there are some post-natal humans who are unable to feel pain due to genetic disorders, and thus do not satisfy all of Warren's criteria. The infanticide objection argues that infants (up to about one year of age, since it is only around then that they begin to outstrip the abilities of non-human animals) have only one of Warren's characteristics—consciousness—and hence would have to be accounted non-persons on her view, and thus it is argued that her view would permit not only abortion but infanticide. Warren agrees that infants are non-persons and so killing them is not strictly murder but denies that infanticide is generally permissible. Once a human being is born, Warren argues that there is no longer a conflict between it and the woman's rights, since the human being can be given up for adoption. Killing such a human being would be wrong not because it is a person but because it would go against the desires of people willing to adopt the infant and to pay to keep the infant alive. This clarification has critics of its own, as beef cattle, chickens, or any other livestock raised for meat—or even some plants—have supporters who would pay to keep them alive. A response to these supports might be that, while livestock, plants, and infants are all not morally persons, the infant is the only life that can be designated a human being, and thus Warren's argument suggests an inherent value for the life of human beings that are not persons over lives that do not have the potential for becoming a person. Warren grants that her argument entails as a logical consequence that infanticide would be morally acceptable under some circumstances, such as those of a desert island. Philosopher Peter Singer similarly concludes that infanticide, particularly of severely disabled infants, is justifiable under certain conditions. Jeff McMahan grants that, under very limited circumstances, it may be permissible to kill one infant to save the lives of several others. Opponents may see these concessions as a reductio ad absurdum of these writers' views, while supporters may see them merely as examples of unpleasant acts being justified in unusual cases. Since brain waves appear in the lower brain (brain stem) in 6–8 weeks of gestation and in the higher brain (cerebral cortex) in 19–20 weeks of gestation, both "whole brain" and "higher brain" brain birth personhood concepts based on the presence of brain waves do not permit infanticide.

=== Natural capacities view ===
Some opponents of Warren's view believe that what matters morally is not that one be actually exhibiting complex mental qualities of the sort she identifies but rather that one have in oneself a self-directed genetic propensity or natural capacity to develop such qualities. In other words, what is crucial is that one be the kind of entity or substance that, under the right conditions, actively develops itself to the point of exhibiting Warren's qualities at some point in its life, even if it does not actually exhibit them because of not having developed them yet (embryo, infant) or having lost them (severe Alzheimer's). Because human beings have this natural capacity—and have it essentially—therefore, according this argument, they essentially have a right to life and could not possibly fail to have a right to life. Furthermore, since modern embryology shows that the embryo begins to exist at conception and has a natural capacity for complex mental qualities, it is argued that the right to life begins at fertilization. Grounding the right to life in essential natural capacities rather than accidental developed capacities is said to have several advantages. As developed capacities are on a continuum, admitting of greater and lesser degrees—for example, some are more rational and self-conscious than others—therefore (1) the "developed capacities" view must arbitrarily select some particular degree of development as the cut-off point for the right to life—whereas the natural capacities view is non-arbitrary; (2) those whose capacities are more developed would have more of a right to life on the "developed capacities" view—whereas the natural capacities view entails that all humans have an equal right to life; and (3) the continuum of developed capacities makes the exact point at which personhood ensues vague, and human beings around that point, say between one and two years of age, will have a shadowy or vague moral status—whereas there is no such indeterminacy on the natural capacities view.

Some defenders of Warren-style arguments grant that these problems have not yet been fully solved; at the same time, they reply that the natural capacities view fares no better. For example, it is argued that as human beings vary significantly in their natural cognitive capacities (due to the inheritance of intelligence, some are naturally more intelligent than others), and as one can imagine a series or spectrum of species with gradually diminishing natural capacities (for example, a series from humans down to amoebae with only the slightest differences in natural capacities between each successive species), the problems of arbitrariness and inequality will apply equally to the natural capacities view. In other words, there is a continuum not only of developed but of natural capacities, and so the natural capacities view will inevitably face these problems as well. Some critics reject the natural capacities view on the basis that it takes mere species membership or genetic potential as a basis for respect (in essence a charge of speciesism), or because it entails that anencephalic infants and the irreversibly comatose have a full right to life. Moreover, some theories of personal identity would support the view that the embryo will never itself develop complex mental qualities (rather, it will simply give rise to a distinct substance or entity that will have these qualities), in which case the natural capacities argument would fail. Respondents to this criticism argue that the noted human cases in fact would not be classified as persons, as they do not have a natural capacity to develop any psychological features.

=== Deprivation argument ===
A seminal essay by Don Marquis argues that abortion is wrong because it deprives the embryo of a valuable future. Marquis begins by arguing that what makes it wrong to kill a normal adult human being is the fact that the killing inflicts a terrible harm on the victim. The harm consists in the fact that "when I die, I am deprived of all of the value of my future", and is being deprived of all the valuable "experiences, activities, projects, and enjoyments" that they would otherwise have had. Thus, if a being has a highly valuable future ahead of it—a "future like ours"—then killing that being would be seriously harmful and hence seriously wrong. As a standard embryo have a highly valuable future, it is argued that killing it is seriously wrong, and so "the overwhelming majority of deliberate abortions are seriously immoral" and are "in the same moral category as killing an innocent adult human being". A consequence of this argument is that abortion is wrong in all the cases where killing a child or adult with the same sort of future as the embryo would be wrong. For example, if involuntary euthanasia of patients with a future filled with intense physical pain is morally acceptable, aborting embryos whose future is filled with intense physical pain will also be morally acceptable. Following this logic, it would not be morally permissible to invoke the fact that some embryo's future would involve such things as being raised by an unloving family, since it is not considered to be acceptable to kill a five-year-old just because their future involves being raised by an unloving family. Similarly, killing a child or adult may be permissible in exceptional circumstances such as self-defense or perhaps capital punishment, although these are irrelevant to standard abortions. Marquis's argument has prompted several objections. The contraception objection claims that if Marquis's argument is correct, then since sperm and ova (or perhaps a sperm and ovum jointly) have a future like human beings, contraception would be as wrong as murder; as this conclusion is considered to be absurd—even those who believe contraception is wrong do not believe it is as wrong as murder—the argument must be unsound. One response is that neither the sperm, nor the egg, nor any particular sperm-egg combination, will ever itself live out a valuable future, and what will later have valuable experiences, activities, projects, and enjoyments is a new entity, a new organism, that will come into existence at or near conception, and it is this entity, not the sperm or egg or any sperm-egg combination, that has a future like human beings.

Marquis's argument requires that what will later have valuable experiences and activities is the same entity, the same biological organism, as the embryo. The identity objection rejects this assumption. On certain theories of personal identity (generally motivated by thought experiments involving brain or cerebrum transplants), each human being is not a biological organism but rather an embodied mind or a person (in John Locke's sense) that comes into existence when the brain gives rise to certain developed psychological capacities. If either of these views is correct, Marquis's argument will fail, for the embryo (even the early fetus, lacking the relevant psychological capacities) would not itself have a future of value but would merely have the potential to give rise to a different entity, an embodied mind or a person, that would have a future of value. The success of Marquis's argument thus depends on one's favored account of personal identity. The interests objection argues that what makes murder wrong is not just the deprivation of a valuable future but the deprivation of a future that one has an interest in. The embryo has no conscious interest in its future, and so it is argued that to kill it is not wrong. The defender of Marquis-style arguments may give the counterexample of the suicidal teenager who takes no interest in their future but killing whom is nonetheless wrong and murder. If the opponent responds that one can have an interest in one's future without taking an interest in it, then the defender of the Marquis-style argument can claim that this applies to the embryo. Similarly, if an opponent argues that what is crucial is having a valuable future which one would, under ideal conditions, desire to preserve (whether or not one desires to preserve it), then the defender may ask why the embryo would not, under ideal conditions, desire to preserve its future. The equality objection argues that Marquis's argument leads to unacceptable inequalities. If killing is wrong because it deprives the victim of a valuable future, as Marquis argues, then since some futures appear to contain much more value than others—a 9-year-old has a much longer future than a 90-year-old and a middle class person's future has much less gratuitous pain and suffering than someone in extreme poverty—some killings would turn out to be much more wrong than others. As this is strongly counterintuitive (most people believe all killings are equally wrong, all other things being equal), Marquis's argument must be mistaken. Some writers argued that the wrongness of killing arises not from the harm it causes the victim (since this varies greatly among killings) but from the killing's violation of the intrinsic worth or personhood of the victim. Such accounts may themselves face problems of equality, and so the equality objection may not be decisive against Marquis's argument. The psychological connectedness objection claims that a being can be seriously harmed by being deprived of a valuable future only if there are sufficient psychological connections—sufficient correlations or continuations of memory, belief, desire, and the like—between the being as it is now and the being as it will be when it lives out the valuable future. As there are few psychological connections between the embryo and its later self, it is concluded that depriving it of its future does not seriously harm it, and hence is not seriously wrong. A defense of this objection is likely to rest, as with certain views of personal identity, on thought experiments involving brain or cerebrum swaps, and this may render it implausible to some readers.

=== Bodily rights argument ===
In her well-known and influential article "A Defense of Abortion", Judith Jarvis Thomson argues that abortion is in some circumstances permissible even if the embryo is a person and has a right to life because the embryo's right to life is overtrumped by the woman's right to control her body and its life-support functions; in short, Thomson's argument is that the right to life does not include or entail the right to use someone else's body. Her central argument involves a thought experiment where an individual, named Bob, wakes up in bed next to a famous violinist. He is unconscious with a fatal kidney ailment, and because only Bob happens to have the right blood type to help, the Society of Music Lovers kidnapped Bob and plugged his circulatory system into the violinist's so that Bob's kidneys can filter poisons from his blood, as well as his own. If the violinist is disconnected from Bob, he will die but in nine months will recover and can be safely disconnected. Thomson takes it that one may permissibly unplug oneself from the violinist even though this will kill him. According to Thomson, the right to life does not entail the right to use another person's body, and so in disconnecting the violinist one does not violate his right to life but merely deprives him of something—the use of another person's body—to which he has no right. Similarly, even if the fetus has a right to life, it does not have a right to use the pregnant woman's body and life-support functions against her will, and so aborting the pregnancy is permissible in at least some circumstances. Thomson observes that the woman's right to abortion does not include the right to directly insist upon the death of the child should the fetus happen to be viable, that is, capable of surviving outside the womb.

Critics of this argument generally agree that unplugging the violinist is permissible but say that there are morally relevant disanalogies between the violinist scenario and typical cases of abortion. The most common objection is that the violinist scenario, involving a kidnapping, is analogous only to abortion after rape. In most cases of abortion, the pregnant woman was not raped but had intercourse voluntarily, and thus has either tacitly consented to allowing the embryo to use her body (the tacit consent objection), or else has a duty to sustain the embryo because the woman herself caused it to stand in need of her body (the responsibility objection). Other common objections turn on the claim that the embryo is the pregnant woman's child whereas the violinist is a stranger (the stranger versus offspring objection); that abortion kills the embryo whereas unplugging the violinist merely lets him die (the killing versus letting die objection); or similarly that abortion intentionally causes the embryo's death whereas unplugging the violinist merely causes death as a foreseen but unintended side-effect (the intending versus foreseeing objection). Defenders of Thomson's argument, most notably David Boonin. reply that the alleged disanalogies between the violinist scenario and typical cases of abortion do not hold, either because the factors that critics appeal to are not genuinely morally relevant, or because those factors are morally relevant but do not apply to abortion in the way that critics have claimed. Critics have in turn responded to Boonin's arguments. Alternative scenarios have been put forth as more accurate and realistic representations of the moral issues present in abortion. John Noonan proposes the scenario of a family who was found to be liable for frostbite finger loss suffered by a dinner guest whom they refused to allow to stay overnight, although it was very cold outside and the guest showed signs of being sick. It is argued that just as it would not be permissible to refuse temporary accommodation for the guest to protect them from physical harm, it would not be permissible to refuse temporary accommodation of a fetus.

Other critics argue that there is a difference between artificial and extraordinary means of preservation, such as medical treatment, kidney dialysis, and blood transfusions, and normal and natural means of preservation, such as gestation, childbirth, and breastfeeding. They argue that if a baby was born into an environment in which there was no replacement available for her mother's breast milk, and the baby would either breastfeed or starve, the mother would have to allow the baby to breastfeed. The mother would never have to give the baby a blood transfusion, no matter what the circumstances were. The difference between breastfeeding in that scenario and blood transfusions is the difference between gestation and childbirth on the one hand, and using one's body as a kidney dialysis machine on the other.

=== Respect for human life ===
One argument against the right to abortion appeals to the secular value of a human life. The thought is that all forms of human life, including the fetus, are inherently valuable because they are connected to human thoughts on family and parenthood, among other natural aspects of humanity. Thus, abortion can express the wrong attitudes towards humanity in a way that manifest vicious character. This view is represented by some forms of humanism and by moral philosopher Rosalind Hursthouse in her widely anthologized article "Virtue Theory and Abortion". According to Hursthouse, thinking about abortion in this way shows the unimportance of rights because one can act viciously in exercising a moral right. For example, she argues that the ending of a human life is always a serious matter and that abortion, when it is wrong, is wrong because it violates a respect for human life. She says: "Love and friendship do not survive their parties' constantly insisting on their rights, nor do people live well when they think that getting what they have a right to is of preeminent importance; they harm others, and they harm themselves."

=== Argument from equality and biological parents' responsibility ===
Abortion rights entail that persons capable of becoming pregnant have the right to relinquish their future parental responsibility; however, the biological fathers of their born children do not have the same right to relinquish their future parental responsibility, thereby violating equality of rights. Turning this argument around, the principle of equal rights and responsibilities, along with biological parents' responsibility toward their born children, implies that either the right to abortion or the right not to be coerced into abortion does not exist.

== See also ==
- Abortion law
- Fetal pain
- Fetal rights
- Fetal viability
- Heartbeat bill
- History of abortion
- Human rights
- Libertarian perspectives on abortion
- Paternal rights and abortion
- Principle of double effect
- Religion and abortion
- Societal attitudes towards abortion
- Unborn Victims of Violence Act

== Bibliography ==
- Baker, L (2000). Persons and Bodies: A Constitution View. Cambridge University Press.
- Beckwith, F (1993). Politically Correct Death. Grand Rapids, Michigan: Baker Books. Chapter 7.
- Beckwith, F (April 2006). "Defending Abortion Philosophically". Journal of Medicine & Philosophy. 31: 177–203. doi:10.1080/03605310600588723.
- Boonin, D (2003). A Defense of Abortion. Cambridge University Press. Chapter 4.
- Doepke, F (1996). The Kinds of Things. Chicago: Open Court.
- English, J (1975). "Abortion and the Concept of a Person". Canadian Journal of Philosophy. 5 (2): 233–243. doi:10.1080/00455091.1975.10716109. PMID 11663579. S2CID 38354546.
- Finnis, J (Winter 1973). "The Rights and Wrongs of Abortion". Philosophy and Public Affairs. 2 (2): 117–145.
- Glover, J (1977). Causing Death and Saving Lives. London: Penguin.
- Grisez, G (1970). Abortion: the Myths, the Realities, and the Arguments. New York: Corpus Books.
- Hasker, W (1999). The Emergent Self. Ithaca, New York: Cornell University Press.
- Larmer, R (1995). "Abortion, Personhood and the Potential for Consciousness". Journal of Applied Philosophy. 12 (3): 241–251. doi:10.1111/j.1468-5930.1995.tb00136.x.
- Lee, P (1996). Abortion and Unborn Human Life. Washington, D.C.: Catholic University of America Press. Chapter 4.
- Lee, P (June 2004). "The Pro-Life Argument from Substantial Identity: A Defense". Bioethics. 18 (3): 249–263. doi:10.1111/j.1467-8519.2004.00393.x. PMID 15341038. SSRN 548046.
- Lee, P; George, R (2005). "The Wrong of Abortion". In Cohen, A; Wellman, C (eds.). Contemporary Debates in Applied Ethics. Oxford: Blackwell. pp. 13–26, at 20–21.
- Mappes, T A; DeGrazia, D, eds. (2001). Biomedical Ethics (5 ed.). New York: McGraw-Hill. ISBN 0072303654.
- Marquis, D (April 1989). "Why Abortion Is Immoral". Journal of Philosophy. 86 (4): 183–202. doi:10.2307/2026961. JSTOR 2026961. PMID 11782094.
- McInerney, P K (May 1990). "Does a Fetus Already Have a Future-Like-Ours?". Journal of Philosophy. 87 (5): 264–268. doi:10.2307/2026834. JSTOR 2026834. PMID 11782096. In Pojman & Beckwith 1998, pp. 357–360.
- McMahan, J (2002). The Ethics of Killing: Problems at the Margins of Life. New York: Oxford University Press. ISBN 9780195079982.
- Naileg, Alex (2024). "My Future Parental Responsibility, My Choice". Elpis. 17 (2): 133–146. doi:10.54310/Elpis.2024.2.11. hdl:10831/115992.
- Noonan, J T (1970). The Morality of Abortion: Legal and Historical Perspectives. Harvard University Press. ISBN 0-674-58725-1.
- Olson, E (1997). The Human Animal. New York: Oxford University Press.
- Paske, G (1994). "Abortion and the Neo-Natal Right to Life: A Critique of Marquis's Futurist Argument". The Abortion Controversy. In Pojman & Beckwith 1998, pp. 361–371.
- Pojman, L (1994). "Abortion: A Defense of the Personhood Argument". The Abortion Controversy. In Pojman & Beckwith 1998, pp. 275–290.
- Pojman, L P; Beckwith, F, eds. (1998). The Abortion Controversy: 25 Years After Roe vs. Wade, A Reader (2 ed.). Belmont, California: Wadsworth.
- Reichlin, M (1997). "The Argument from Potential: A Reappraisal". Bioethics. 11 (1): 1–23. doi:10.1111/1467-8519.00041. PMID 11656607.
- Rogers, K (1992). "Personhood, Potentiality, and the Temporarily Comatose Patient". Public Affairs Quarterly. 6 (2): 245–254. PMID 11652631.
- Schwarz, S (1990). The Moral Question of Abortion. Chicago: Loyola University Press. Chapter 8.
- Singer, P (2000). Writings on an Ethical Life. Ecco (HarperCollins). ISBN 978-0-06-019838-1.
- Steinbock, B (1992). Life Before Birth: The Moral and Legal Status of Embryos and Fetuses. Oxford University Press. ISBN 978-0-19-510872-9.
- Stone, J (1987). "Why Potentiality Matters". Canadian Journal of Philosophy. 17 (4): 815–30. doi:10.1080/00455091.1987.10715920. S2CID 147106418.
- Stone, J (1994). "Why Potentiality Still Matters". Canadian Journal of Philosophy. 24 (2): 281–94. doi:10.1080/00455091.1994.10717370. S2CID 170338877.
- Stretton, D (2004a). "The Deprivation Argument Against Abortion". Bioethics. 18 (2): 144–180. doi:10.1111/j.1467-8519.2004.00386.x. PMID 15148946.
- Stretton, D (2004b). "Essential Properties and the Right to Life: A Response to Lee". Bioethics. 18 (3): 264–282. doi:10.1111/j.1467-8519.2004.00394.x. PMID 15341039.
- Thomson, J (1971). "A Defense of Abortion". Philosophy and Public Affairs. 1 (1): 47–66.
- Tooley, Michael (Autumn 1972). "Abortion and Infanticide". Philosophy and Public Affairs. 2 (1). pp. 37–65, at 52–53.
- Tooley, M (1984). "In Defense of Abortion and Infanticide". What Is a Person?. pp. 83–114. doi:10.1007/978-1-4612-3950-5_4. ISBN 978-1-4612-8412-3. In Pojman & Beckwith 1998, pp. 209–233.
- Warren, M A (1973). "On the Moral and Legal Status of Abortion". Monist. 57 (1): 43–61. doi:10.5840/monist197357133. PMID 11661013. Reprinted in Mappes & DeGrazia 2001, pp. 456–463.
  - Warren, M A (1996) [1982]. "Postscript on Infanticide" (PDF). On the Moral and Legal Status of Abortion (4th ed. excerpt excl. notes). Reprinted in Mappes & DeGrazia 2001, pp. 461–463. The postscript is with regards to Warren 1973 cited above.
- Warren, M A (1978). "Do Potential People Have Moral Rights?". In Sikora, R I; Barry, B (eds.). Obligations to Future Generations. Philadelphia: Temple University Press. pp. 14–30. ISBN 9781874267317. JSTOR j.ctv289dvx3.5.
- Warren, M A (July 1982). "Abortion and Moral Theory". Analytic Philosophy. 23 (3): 184–187. doi:10.1111/j.1468-0149.1982.tb00178.x.
