= Thomson's lamp =

Philosophical puzzle

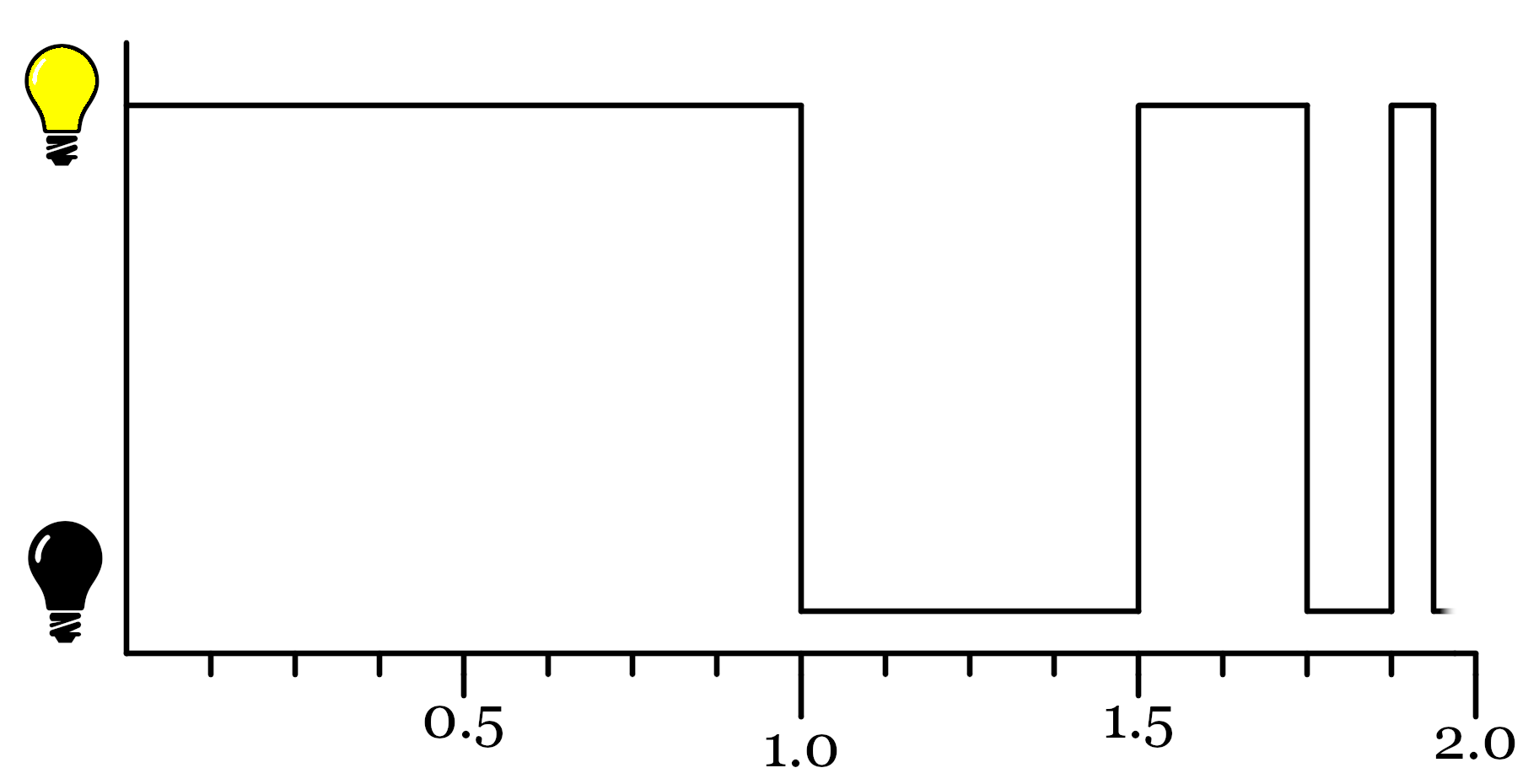
The thought experiment concerns a lamp that is toggled on and off with increasing frequency.

Thomson's lamp is a philosophical thought experiment based on infinites. It was devised in 1954 by British philosopher James F. Thomson, who used it to analyze the possibility of a supertask, which is the completion of an infinite number of tasks.

Consider a lamp with a toggle switch. Flicking the switch once turns the lamp on. Another flick will turn the lamp off. Now suppose that there is a being who is able to perform the following task: starting a timer, he turns the lamp on. At the end of one minute, he turns it off. At the end of another half minute, he turns it on again. At the end of another quarter of a minute, he turns it off. At the next eighth of a minute, he turns it on again, and he continues thus, flicking the switch each time after waiting exactly one-half the time he waited before flicking it previously. The sum of this infinite series of time intervals is exactly two minutes.

The following question is then considered: Is the lamp on or off at two minutes? Thomson reasoned that this supertask creates a contradiction:

It seems impossible to answer this question. It cannot be on, because I did not ever turn it on without at once turning it off. It cannot be off, because I did in the first place turn it on, and thereafter I never turned it off without at once turning it on. But the lamp must be either on or off. This is a contradiction.

== Mathematical series analogy ==
The question is related to the behavior of Grandi's series, i.e. the divergent infinite series

- S = 1 − 1 + 1 − 1 + 1 − 1 + · · ·

For even values of n, the above finite series sums to 1; for odd values, it sums to 0. In other words, as n takes the values of each of the non-negative integers 0, 1, 2, 3, ... in turn, the series generates the sequence {1, 0, 1, 0, ...}, representing the changing state of the lamp. The sequence does not converge as n tends to infinity, so neither does the infinite series.

Another way of illustrating this problem is to rearrange the series:

- S = 1 − (1 − 1 + 1 − 1 + 1 − 1 + · · ·)

The unending series in the parentheses is exactly the same as the original series S. This means S = 1 − S which implies S = ^{1}/_{2}. In fact, this manipulation can be rigorously justified: there are generalized definitions for the sums of series that do assign Grandi's series the value ^{1}/_{2}.

One of Thomson's objectives in his original 1954 paper is to differentiate supertasks from their series analogies. He writes of the lamp and Grandi's series,

Then the question whether the lamp is on or off… is the question: What is the sum of the infinite divergent sequence

+1, −1, +1, ...?

Now mathematicians do say that this sequence has a sum; they say that its sum is ^{1}/_{2}. And this answer does not help us, since we attach no sense here to saying that the lamp is half-on. I take this to mean that there is no established method for deciding what is done when a super-task is done. … We cannot be expected to pick up this idea, just because we have the idea of a task or tasks having been performed and because we are acquainted with transfinite numbers.

Later, he claims that even the divergence of a series does not provide information about its supertask: "The impossibility of a super-task does not depend at all on whether some vaguely-felt-to-be-associated arithmetical sequence is convergent or divergent."

== See also ==
- List of paradoxes
- Ross–Littlewood paradox
- Zeno's paradoxes
- Zeno machine
