= Evictionism =

Libertarian based moral theory regarding abortion

Evictionism is a moral theory advanced by Walter Block and Roy Whitehead on a proposed libertarian view of abortion based on property rights. This theory is built upon the earlier work of philosopher Murray Rothbard who wrote that "no being has a right to live, unbidden, as a parasite within or upon some person's body" and that therefore the woman is entitled to eject the baby from her body at any time. Evictionists view a woman's womb as her property and an unwanted fetus as a "trespasser or parasite", even while lacking the will to act. They argue that a pregnant woman has the right to evict a fetus from her body since she has no obligation to care for a trespasser. The authors' hope is that bystanders will "homestead" the right to care for evicted babies and reduce the number of human deaths. They argue that life begins at conception and state that the act of abortion must be conceptually separated into the acts of:

1. the eviction of the fetus from the womb, and
2. the dying of the baby.

Building on the libertarian stand against trespass and murder, Block supports a right to the first act (eviction), but not the second act (murder).

Walter Block believes the woman always has a right to evict:

1. if done in the gentlest manner possible regardless of the death of the fetus, and
2. the woman has publicly announced her abandonment of the right to custody of the fetus.

== Embryonic research ==
Likewise, Block proposes that medical experimenters can treat the embryos they have in their possession as laboratory "animals", as is their desire, contingent on only one stipulation: that no one else wishes to raise these very young infants on their own. If there are adoptive parents who wish to homestead the right to care for the children, their rights trump those of the creators of the fertilized egg since the former wishes to protect the child from harm, while the latter does not. Thus, Block offers an alternative to the standard choice between the anti-abortion and pro-choice positions on stem cell research.

== Advances in technology ==
Evictionists believe that advances in technology will continue to improve the medical ability to preserve a living fetus after removal from its mother. This future technology is hoped to save the lives of evicted fetuses at increasingly younger ages whereas aborted fetuses would continue to die at any age.

During the past several decades, neonatal care has improved with advances in medical science, and therefore the limit of viability has moved earlier. The lower limit of viability is approximately five months' gestational age, and usually later.

== Departurism ==
Jakub Wisniewski, a Polish libertarian theoretician who championed the non-aggression principle (NAP) over a mother's right to abort a consensually-conceived fetus, and Sean Parr, who introduced the alternative departurism, have made counter-arguments to evictionism.

== See also ==
- Libertarian perspectives on abortion
- Non-aggression principle
