= Republican National Coalition for Life =

American anti-abortion organization

The Republican National Coalition for Life (RNCL), often stylized as RNC/Life, is an organization formed to maintain the commitment of the Republican Party of the United States to anti-abortion principles.

== History ==
RNC/Life was founded by Phyllis Schlafly in the autumn of 1990 after two groups, Republicans for Choice and National Republican Coalition for Choice, publicly announced their intention to provoke a floor fight at the 1992 Republican National Convention in Houston, Texas, in order to remove the anti-abortion plank from the convention platform.

The Republican Party has been the anti-abortion national political party since a resolution in support of efforts to secure a Human Life Amendment to the United States Constitution was adopted at the 1976 Republican National Convention, following the 1973 Roe v. Wade decision.

The executive director of RNC/Life from 1990 to 2010 was Colleen Parro Baillargeon.

== Post-Dobbs ==
After the Dobbs v. Jackson Women's Health Supreme Court decision overturning Roe in 2022, the focus of RNC/Life shifted to state legislative action. They have polled state legislators on abortion and have endorsed Republicans who agree with their position.

Ed Martin has been president of RNC/Life since 2013.

== See also ==
- Democrats for Life of America
- Libertarians for Life
- Republican Majority for Choice
- United States anti-abortion movement
