= Kathrin Koslicki =

Canadian academic

- Born: November 30, 1967 (age 58); Munich, West Germany

Academic background
- Education: Stony Brook University; MIT
- Thesis: Talk about Stuffs and Things: The Logic of Mass and Count Nouns (1995)
- Doctoral advisor: Judith Jarvis Thomson

Academic work
- Discipline: Philosophy
- Institutions: University of Colorado-Boulder; Tufts University; University of Florida; University of New Orleans; University of Alberta; University of Neuchâtel

Kathrin Koslicki (born 1967) is a German philosopher who is Professor of Theoretical Philosophy at the University of Neuchâtel, Switzerland. Her primary research areas are metaphysics, ancient Greek philosophy and philosophy of language. Since 2018 Koslicki is visiting professor at the University of Italian Switzerland.

== Biography ==
Koslicki was born and raised in Munich, Germany. She received her BA in philosophy from the State University of New York at Stony Brook in 1990 and her PhD in philosophy from the Massachusetts Institute of Technology in 1995.

Koslicki joined the faculty at the University of Colorado-Boulder in 2007. At the University of Colorado-Boulder, Koslicki sat as Chair of both the Graduate Admissions and Climate Committee, and received the Alvin Plantinga fellowship at the University of Notre Dame. Seven years later, she accepted an appointment as a Tier 1 Canada Research Chair in Epistemology and Metaphysics at the University of Alberta. Since 2019 Koslicki is Visiting Professor at the University of Italian Switzerland.

Koslicki is best known for her defense of a neo-Aristotelian, structure-based theory of parts and wholes.

== Bibliography ==
- Koslicki, Kathrin (2008). The structure of objects. Oxford: Oxford University Press. ISBN 978-0-19-153867-4. OCLC 227006033.
- Koslicki, Kathrin (2018). Form, matter, substance. Oxford: Oxford University Press. ISBN 978-0-19-255708-7. OCLC 1049974758.
- Co editor with Michael J. Raven of The Routledge Handbook of Essence in Philosophy (2024) ISBN 978-1-032-74659-3
