= Michael Scriven =

Australian academic philosopher (1928–2023)

- Born: 28 March 1928; England
- Died: 23 August 2023 (aged 95); California, USA
- Known for: Theory and practice of evaluation
- Spouse: Mary Anne Warren

Michael John Scriven (/ˈskrɪvən/; 28 March 1928 – 28 August 2023) was a British-born Australian polymath and academic philosopher, best known for his contributions to the theory and practice of evaluation.

== Biography ==
Scriven was born in the UK and grew up in Melbourne, Australia. He held BSc (1948) and MS (1950) degrees in mathematics from the University of Melbourne, where he was in residence at Trinity College from 1946, winning an entrance scholarship. He then completed a doctorate in philosophy from the University of Oxford (1956).

Scriven was a president of the American Educational Research Association and the American Evaluation Association. He was also an editor and co-founder of the Journal of MultiDisciplinary Evaluation/. He was latterly a distinguished professor at Claremont Graduate University in California.

He spent most of his career in the United States. He became a full Professor at the age of 32. His major appointments were:

- Swarthmore College (Assistant Professor, 1956–60)
- Indiana University (Professor of Philosophy, 1960–1966)
- University of California, Berkeley (Professor of Philosophy and later of Education 1966–78)
- University of San Francisco (Professor, 1978–82)
- University of Western Australia (Professor of Education 1982–89)
- Pacific Graduate School of Psychology (1989–1992)
- Western Michigan University (1994–95, 2004–07)
- Claremont Graduate University (1997–2002 and 2007–)
- University of Auckland (Professor of Evaluation 2003–4)

He was married to the feminist ethicist Mary Anne Warren. They had no children.

== Scholarly contributions ==
Scriven made significant contributions in the fields of philosophy, psychology, critical thinking, mathematics, and, most notably, evaluation theory and the establishment of evaluation as a transdiscipline. In 1971, he called for the replacement of 'goal achievement' in evaluation with the evaluation of whether a programme is able to meet the needs of its intended beneficiaries. "It seemed to me, in short, that consideration and evaluation of goals was an unnecessary but also a possibly contaminating step. I began to work on an alternative approach – simply, the evaluation of actual effects against (typically) a profile of demonstrated needs in this region of education." (1972, p. 1)

Scriven's work in education influenced the work of many scholars, including that of Robert E. Stake, Ernest R. House, Benjamin Bloom, and Gene V Glass.

He wrote over 400 scholarly publications and served on the editorial review boards of 42 journals.

== Awards ==
Scriven received numerous awards, including:

- Lazarfeld Prize, awarded by the American Evaluation Association for outstanding research contributions to the field of evaluation (1986)
- Donald Campbell Award of the Policy Studies Association (citation reads "...as an outstanding methodological innovator in public policy studies") (1996)
- Wilbert J. McKeachie award for lifetime contribution to the study of faculty evaluation and development, awarded by the Special Interest Group on Faculty Evaluation and Development of the American Educational Research Association (1996+)
- Honorary Fellow of the American Education Research Association (AERA) for lifetime contributions to education research (1996+)
- Jason Millman award for lifetime contribution to evaluation, awarded by CREATE (Coalition for Research and Evaluation on Teacher Education) (1996+)
- Robert Ingle award for outstanding service to the American Evaluation Association (1996+)
- Award for Lifetime Contribution to the Teaching of Philosophy, American Association of Teachers of Philosophy, Toledo, Ohio (2004)
- Member, Academy of Social Sciences in Australia
- Honorary Member, Phi Beta Kappa, Theta chapter of Michigan (2006)
- D.Ed. (Honoris causa) University of Melbourne (2013)
- Festschrift volume: S. Donaldson (Ed.) (2013) The future of evaluation in society: A tribute to Michael Scriven. Information Age Publishing.

== Listings ==
- Who's Who in America
- Who's Who in Australia
- American Men of Education
- International Scholars Directory, The Writers Directory
- Directory of American Scholars
- Dictionary of International Biography

== Major publications ==
- Moncrieff, W. & Scriven, M. (1956). The gas turbine in automobile design. Minnesota. Privately published.
- Feigl, H., & Scriven, M. (eds.) (1956). The foundations of science and the concepts of psychology and psychoanalysis. Minnesota Studies in the Philosophy of Science, Vol. 1. University of Minnesota.
- Feigl, H., Maxwell, G., & Scriven, M. (eds.) (1958). Concepts, theories, and the mind-body problem. Minnesota Studies in the Philosophy of Science, Vol. 2. University of Minnesota.
- Feigl, H., Maxwell, G., & Scriven, M. (eds.) (1962). Scientific explanation, space, and time. Minnesota Studies in the Philosophy of Science, Vol. 3. University of Minnesota.
- Scriven, M. (1964). Computers and comprehension. RAND monograph.
- Scriven, M. (1965). Applied logic: An introduction to scientific method. Behavioral Research Laboratories.
- Scriven, M. (1966, reprinted). Primary philosophy. McGraw-Hill.
- Moore, W., & Scriven, M. (eds.) (1966). Collected papers of Eugene R. Wigner. Indiana University.
- Scriven, M. (ed.) (1966). Morality. Social Science Education Consortium.
- Tyler, R. W., Gagne, R. M., & Scriven, M. (Eds.). 1967. Perspectives of Curriculum Evaluation. American Educational Research Association Monograph Series on Curriculum Evaluation, Vol. 1. Rand McNally.
- Scriven, M. (1970). Philosophy of science. NETCHE.
- Scriven, M. (1974). Evaluation: A study guide for educational administrators. Nova University.
- Scriven, M. (1976). Reasoning. McGraw-Hill. ISBN 0-07-055882-5
- Scriven, M. & Roth, J. (1977, reprinted).Evaluation thesaurus. EdgePress and Sage.
- Davis, B., Thomas, S. & Scriven, M. (1981). The evaluation of composition instruction. EdgePress (for the Carnegie Corporation).
- Scriven, M. (1981). The logic of evaluation. EdgePress.
- Manus, S. & Scriven, M. (1982). How to buy a word processor: Electronic typewriters, personal computers, and dedicated systems. Alfred Publishing Company.
- Scriven, M. (1987). Word magic: Evaluating and selecting word processing. Wadsworth and van Nostrand.
- Scriven, M. (1987). Theory and practice of evaluation. EdgePress.
- McConney, A., Scriven, M., Stronge, J., Stufflebeam, D., & Webster, W. (1995). Toward a unified model: The foundations of educational personnel evaluation. Center for Research on Educational Accountability and Teacher Evaluation.
- Madaus, G., Scriven, M., & Stufflebeam, D. (Eds.). (1983).Evaluation Models.Kluwer-Nijhoff Publishing.
- Scriven, M. (1991). Evaluation Thesaurus. Sage.
- Scriven, M. (1993). Hard won lessons in program evaluation. Jossey-Bass.
- Fisher, A. & Scriven, M. (1997). Critical thinking: Its definition and assessment. UK: Centre for Research in Critical Thinking, and EdgePress.
- Donaldson, S.I. & Scriven, M. (Eds.). (2003). Evaluating social programs and problems: Visions for the new millennium. Erlbaum.
- Coryn C.L.S. and M. Scriven (eds.) (2008). Reforming the Evaluation of Research: New Directions for Evaluation, Number 118. Jossey-Bass.

== Scriven number ==
In 2012, an article published in the Journal of MultiDisciplinary Evaluation posed the necessity of a Scriven number. Similar to an Erdős number, a Scriven number describes a person's degree of separation from Dr. Scriven through published collaborations directly with him or with others who have collaborated with him. Michael Scriven held the unique Scriven number of 0 while any persons publishing directly with him hold a Scriven number of 1. In addition, those who have published with those individuals who have directly published with Dr. Scriven hold a Scriven number of 2. This algorithmic format continues indefinitely. For those published with multiple papers with paths to Dr. Scriven, the shortest path will serve as the Scriven number. This type of number is hypothesized to help centralize the field of evaluation.

== Notes ==
Educational offices
Preceded by James Popham	President of the American Educational Research Association; 1978–1979	Succeeded by Ellis B. Page
