= Mary Anne Warren =

American philosopher (1946–2010)

- Born: August 23, 1946
- Died: August 9, 2010 (aged 63)
- Occupations: Philosopher; writer; professor
- Spouse: Michael Scriven

Philosophical work
- Institutions: San Francisco State University
- Main interests: Abortion; personhood; animal rights

Mary Anne Warren (August 23, 1946 – August 9, 2010) was an American writer and philosophy professor, noted for her writings on the issue of abortion and animal rights.

== Biography ==
Warren was a professor of philosophy at San Francisco State University for many years. Her essays have sometimes been required readings in academic courses dealing with the abortion debate and they are frequently cited in major publications like Peter Singer's The Moral of the Story: An Anthology of Ethics Through Literature and Bernard Gert's Bioethics: A Systematic Approach. She was sometimes described as a feminist, largely due to her pro-choice writings. Warren also wrote on the implications of sex selection and about animal rights.

She was married to the philosopher Michael Scriven. They had no children.

Warren died on August 9, 2010, from cancer.

== Criteria of personhood ==
In response to whether a thing can be said to be a person, and so have moral standing, Warren suggested the following criteria:

1. Sentience—the capacity to have conscious experiences, usually including the capacity to experience pain and pleasure;
2. Emotionality—the capacity to feel happy, sad, angry, loving, etc.;
3. Reason—the capacity to solve new and relatively complex problems;
4. The Capacity to Communicate—by whatever means, messages of an indefinite variety of types, i.e., not just with an indefinite number of possible contents but on indefinitely many possible topics;
5. Self-Awareness—having a conception of oneself as an individual and/or as a member of a social group;
6. Moral Agency—the capacity to regulate one's own actions though moral principles or ideals.

She stated that at least some of these are necessary, if not sufficient, criteria for personhood (which is necessary and sufficient for moral standing). She argued that fetuses do not meet any of these criteria; therefore, they are not persons and have no moral standing. Abortion is thus morally permissible. However, some philosophers have criticized Warren's criteria. For instance, Don Marquis charged that Warren's criteria are “…plagued by difficulties concerning cases”.

== Animal rights ==
Warren argued for an animal rights position called the "weak animal rights position" in contrast to the strong animal rights position of Tom Regan. Her weak animal rights position held the view that sentience is a sufficient condition for having some sort of moral rights. She stated that although all sentient animals have rights (including the right not without compelling reason to be killed or made to suffer) their rights are not identical in strength to humans and thus can be more easily overridden depending on certain economic or social considerations. One such example she used was killing rodents to protect damage of crops or to prevent the spread of disease that can harm or kill humans. According to Warren:

Rodents of several species habitually live in proximity to humans. In doing so, they consume and contaminate food, and sometimes spread lethal diseases, such as bubonic plague—the “Black Death” of the Middle Ages, which is carried by fleas that live on rats. Rodents also have extraordinarily high reproductive rates. Thus, while we may be able to tolerate a few rodents in our homes and granaries, a policy of complete tolerance would often lead to disaster.

Warren argued that as some animals are more sentient and have a greater sense of awareness than others the thesis that all subjects-of-a-life have equal moral status should be rejected. She used the example of the moral status of a spider. She commented that if Regan's view is right then "we are forced to say that either a spider has the same right to life as you and I do, or it has no right to life whatever– and that only the gods know which of these alternatives is true." She stated that Regan's subject-of-a-life criteria provides no clear moral guidance of how to deal with most animals.

Warren dismissed the notion of equal rights as problematic and defended a "sliding scale of moral status". In her weak animal rights position, animals have different degrees of inherent value depending on their levels of awareness and sentience. Her scale based on levels of sentience and mental ability had human interests above animals and higher order animal interests above lower order animals. According to Warren we have stronger obligations to animals which have higher degrees of mental sophistication and sentience so our obligations to tadpoles and scorpions will be relatively weak compared to apes, dolphins or elephants.

In 2007, philosopher Aaron Simmons wrote a detailed rebuttal to Warren's weak animal rights position. Simmons concluded that "Warren fails to justify her beliefs that animals do not have an equal right to life and that it is permissible for humans to kill animals for food".

== Select publications ==
Books

- Warren, Mary Anne, Gendercide: The Implications of Sex Selection; Rowman & Littlefield Publishers (1985) ISBN 978-0-8476-7330-8
- Warren, Mary Anne, Moral Status - Obligations to Persons and Other Living Things ; Oxford University Press (2000) ISBN 978-0-19-825040-1

Essays

- Warren, Mary Anne, "On the Moral and Legal Status of Abortion". The Monist 57 (1): 43–61, (1973)
- Warren, Mary Anne, "Do Potential People Have Moral Rights?" In R Sikora and B Barry, eds. Obligations to Future Generations. Philadelphia, PA: Temple University Press,: 14-30, (1978)
- Warren, Mary Anne, "Postscript on Infanticide". Reprinted in Mappes and DeGrazia 2001: 461-463, (1982)
- Warren, Mary Anne, "The Nature of Woman: An Encyclopedia and Guide to the Literature". EdgePress (1980)
- Warren, Mary Anne, "Difficulties With the Strong Animal Rights Position". Between the Species 2 (4): 163-173, (1986).
- "The Moral Significance of Birth". Hypatia 4 (3), Ethics & Reproduction, pp. 46–65, (1989)
- Warren, Mary Anne, "The Moral Difference Between Infanticide and Abortion: A Response to Robert Card". Bioethics, Vol. 14, pp. 352–359 (October 2000)
- Warren, Mary Anne, "The Rights of the Nonhuman World". In Clare Palmer. Animal Rights. Routledge (2017)

== See also ==
- American philosophy
- List of American philosophers
