= Libertarian perspectives on abortion =

Political ideology

Libertarians promote individual liberty and seek to minimize the role of the state. The abortion debate is mainly within propertarianism/right-libertarianism between cultural liberals and social conservatives, as left-libertarians generally see it as a settled issue regarding individual rights, as they support legal access to abortion as part of what they consider to be a woman's right to control her body and its functions. Religious right and intellectual conservatives have attacked such libertarians for supporting abortion rights, especially after the demise of the Soviet Union led to a greater divide in the conservative movement between libertarians and social conservatives. Libertarian conservatives claim libertarian principles such as the non-aggression principle (NAP) apply to human beings from conception and that the universal right to life applies to fetuses in the womb. Thus, some of those individuals express opposition to legal abortion. According to a 2013 survey, 5.7/10 of American Libertarians oppose making it more difficult for a woman to get an abortion.

== Support for legal abortion ==
Russian-born American novelist and philosopher, Ayn Rand, argued that the notion of a fetus's having a right to life is "vicious nonsense" and stated: "An embryo has no rights. [...] A child cannot acquire any rights until it is born". She also wrote: "Abortion is a moral right—which should be left to the sole discretion of the woman involved; morally, nothing other than her wish in the matter is to be considered". Leonard Peikoff, a close associate of Ayn Rand and co-founder of the Ayn Rand Institute, stated that:

That tiny growth, that mass of protoplasm, exists as a part of a woman's body. It is not an independently existing, biologically formed organism, let alone a person. [...] Sentencing a woman to sacrifice her life to an embryo is not upholding the "right to life." The anti-abortionists' claim to being "pro-life" is a classic Big Lie. You cannot be in favor of life and yet demand the sacrifice of an actual, living individual to a clump of tissue. Anti-abortionists are not lovers of life – lovers of tissue, maybe. But their stand marks them as haters of real human beings.

Anarcho-capitalist philosopher and Austrian school economist Murray Rothbard wrote that "no being has a right to live, unbidden, as a parasite within or upon some person's body" and that therefore the woman is entitled to eject the fetus from her body at any time. However, explaining the right of the woman to "eject the fetus from her body", Rothbard also wrote that "every baby as soon as it is born and is therefore no longer contained within his mother's body possesses the right of self-ownership by virtue of being a separate entity and a potential adult. It must therefore be illegal and a violation of the child's rights for a parent to aggress against his person by mutilating, torturing, murdering him, etc." Rothbard also opposed all federal interference with the right of local governments to fashion their own laws, so he opposed the Supreme Court's Roe v. Wade decision. He believed that states should be able to author their own abortion policies. He also opposed taxpayer funding for abortion clinics, writing "it is peculiarly monstrous to force those who abhor abortion as murder to pay for such murders".

19th-century individualist anarchist Benjamin Tucker initially concluded that no one should interfere to prevent neglect of the child, although they could still repress a positive invasion. However, Tucker, having reconsidered his opinion, resolved that parental cruelty is of non-invasive character and therefore is not to be prohibited. Tucker's opinion is grounded on the fact that he viewed the child as the property of the mother while in the womb and until the time of their emancipation (at the age of being able to contract and provide for themselves) unless the mother had disposed of the fruit of her womb by contract. In the meantime, Tucker recognized the right of the mother to dispose of her property as she sees it fit. According to Tucker's logic, "the outsider who uses force upon the child invades, not the child, but its mother, and may be rightfully punished for doing so".

In "The Right to Abortion: A Libertarian Defense", the Association of Libertarian Feminists created what they call a "systematic philosophical defense of the moral case for abortion from a libertarian perspective". It concludes: "To sacrifice existing persons for the sake of future generations, whether in slave labor camps for the utopian nightmares of Marxists or fascists, or in unwanted pregnancies, compulsory childbearing, and furtive coat hanger abortions for the edification of fetus-worshippers, is to establish hell on earth".

Capitalism Magazine supports the abortion-rights position, writing:

A fetus does not have a right to be in the womb of any woman, but is there by her permission. This permission may be revoked by the woman at any time, because her womb is part of her body... There is no such thing as the right to live inside the body of another, i.e., there is no right to enslave... a woman is not a breeding pig owned by the state (or church). Even if a fetus were developed to the point of surviving as an independent being outside the pregnant woman's womb, the fetus would still not have the right to be inside the woman's womb.

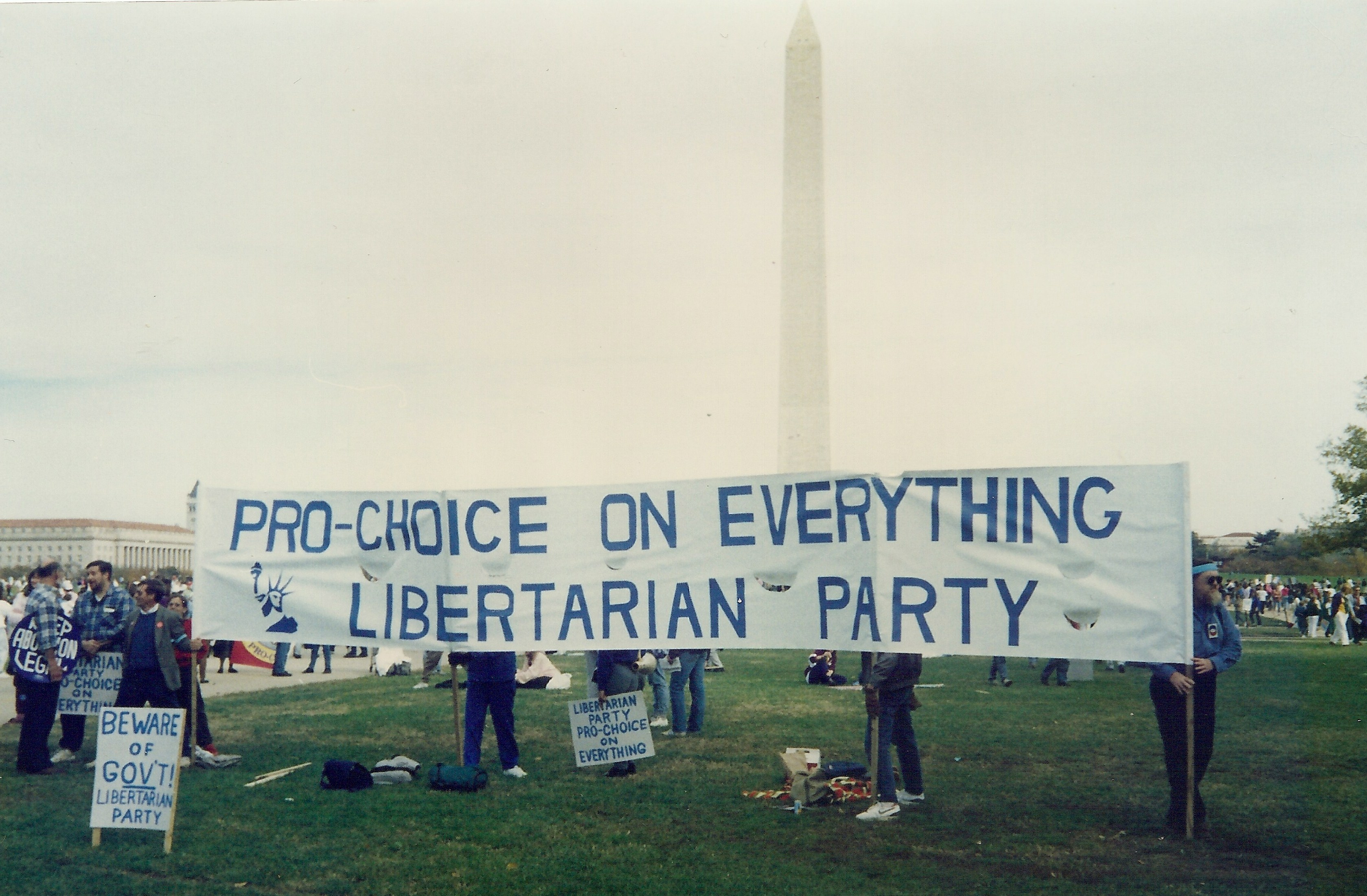
Libertarians at the November 12, 1989, abortion rights march in Washington, D.C.

Harry Browne, the Libertarian Party candidate for president in 1996 and 2000, rejected the terms "pro-life" and "pro-choice" and stated about abortion: "Whatever we believe abortion is, we know one thing: Government doesn't work, and it is as incapable of eliminating abortions as it is of eliminating poverty or drugs".

The Libertarian Party's 2004 presidential candidate Michael Badnarik had a similar position, writing: "I oppose government control over the abortion issue. I believe that giving the government control of this issue could lead to more abortions rather than fewer, because the left-right pendulum of power swings back and forth. This shift could place the power to set policy in the hands of those who demand strict population control. The government that can ban abortion can just as easily mandate abortion, as is currently the case in China". The party's 2012 presidential candidate Gary Johnson wanted to keep abortion legal.

=== Prior U.S. Libertarian Party national platform ===
The 2012-May 2022 political platform of the Libertarian Party stated, "Recognizing that abortion is a sensitive issue and that people can hold good-faith views on all sides, we believe that government should be kept out of the matter, leaving the question to each person for their conscientious consideration."

=== Other organizations ===
Other abortion rights libertarian organizations include the Association of Libertarian Feminists and Pro-Choice Libertarians.

== Opposition to legal abortion ==
The anti-abortion libertarian group Libertarians for Life argues that humans in the zygotic, embryonic and fetal stages of development have the same rights as humans in the neonatal stage and beyond. Doris Gordon of the group notes that the principles of both the Libertarian Party and Objectivist ethics require some obligation to children and counter with an appeal to the non-aggression principle:

Non-aggression is an ongoing obligation: it is never optional for anyone, even pregnant women. If the non-aggression obligation did not apply, then earning money versus stealing it and consensual sex versus rape would be morally indifferent behaviors. The obligation not to aggress is pre-political and pre-legal. It does not arise out of contract, agreement, or the law; rather, such devices presuppose this obligation. The obligation would exist even in a state of nature. This is because the obligation comes with our human nature, and we acquire this nature at conception.

=== Evictionism ===
Walter Block, Rothbardian writer and professor of economics at Loyola University New Orleans, provides an alternative to the standard choice between "pro-life" and "pro-choice" which he terms "evictionism". According to this moral theory, the act of abortion must be conceptually separated into the acts of (a) eviction of the fetus from the womb; and (b) killing the fetus. Building on the libertarian stand against trespass and murder, Block supports a right to the first act, but except in certain circumstances not the second act. He believes the woman may legally abort if (a) the fetus is not viable outside the womb, or (b) the woman has publicly announced her abandonment of the right to custody of a viable fetus, and it has not been claimed.

=== Departurism ===
Departurism is a theory developed by Sean Parr which, like evictionism, holds that the mother may evict but not directly kill the "trespassing" fetus, but, contrary to evictionism, neither may she kill him by eviction. The mother, if her actions are to conform to gentleness (an ex ante element of law akin to the ex post element proportionality), must allow for the continued departure of the trespasser until such time that eviction no longer entails his death. That is, it is only the fatal (or otherwise seriously injurious) eviction of a fetus during a normal pregnancy that departurism argues is discordant with gentleness and, thus, a NAP-violation.

=== Preargumentation-Ethics ===
A 2024 article by Christos Armoutidis advances a “preargumentation ethics” framework, derived from Hans-Hermann Hoppe’s argumentation ethics, to determine when rights begin within libertarian theory. The article argues that the preconditions of argumentation imply that it cannot be denied that any being with the potential to engage in argumentation—rather than a present ability—qualifies as a rights-bearing subject. On this criterion, Armoutidis concludes that abortion is unjustifiable because it violates the rights of a human being who already counts as a rights-bearer prior to birth. The paper has been noted in contemporary libertarian discussions alongside other approaches such as evictionism and decentralist proposals.

=== Anti-abortion political officials ===
==== Ron and Rand Paul ====
Anti-abortion Republican and former Libertarian congressman Ron Paul says in "Abortion and Liberty":

It's no coincidence that today's argument over abortion comes at a time when freedom in general is threatened in the United States, as well as in other Western countries. Nor was it accidental that genocide, abortion, and euthanasia were all practiced under Hitler, and that all three characterize totalitarian states. Even today, Communist governments vary their positions on abortion strictly on economic calculations of whether more or fewer slaves are needed.

His main position calls for overturning Roe v. Wade and letting the states decide the issue. Ron Paul's son, Republican Senator Rand Paul, calls himself "totally pro-life" and supports "any and all legislation that would end abortion or lead us in the direction of ending abortion".

==== Bob Barr ====
In 2008, the Libertarian Party candidate for president was Bob Barr, who since 2011 has been a Republican, and who has called abortion "murder" and opposed legalized abortion.

==== Justin Amash ====
Republican-turned-Libertarian Justin Amash opposes abortion and federal funding for abortion. He describes himself as "100 percent pro-life" and in 2017 voted in favor of federal legislation to ban most abortions after 20 weeks of pregnancy.

Amash voted "present", rather than "yes" or "no", on the 2011 Full Year Continuing Appropriations Act, which provided for the cessation of federal funding to Planned Parenthood. Although he supports eliminating federal funding for Planned Parenthood, he abstained from defunding legislation, arguing that "legislation that names a specific private organization to defund (rather than all organizations that engage in a particular activity) is improper" and an "arguably unconstitutional" bill of attainder.

In May 2012, Amash was one of seven Republicans to vote against the Prenatal Non-Discrimination Act, which would have made it a crime for a doctor to perform an abortion on a woman who wants to end a pregnancy based on the gender of the fetus. He criticized the bill as ineffective and virtually impossible to enforce, and said Congress "should not criminalize thought", while maintaining that he believes "all abortion should be illegal".

==== Austin Petersen ====
Austin Petersen, presidential candidate for the Libertarian Party in 2016 and Republican candidate for senator in 2018, is a believer and advocate for a consistent life ethic, meaning that he opposes both abortion and the death penalty.

=== Anti-abortion political pundits ===
Talk radio host Larry Elder has argued that Roe v. Wade should be overturned, calling the decision "one of the worst decisions that the Supreme Court ever handed down." He has called abortion "murder" and believes that abortion laws should be decided at the state level.

Economist and social theorist Thomas Sowell has condemned partial-birth abortion Sowell also condemned sex-selective abortions labeling them "the most basic kind of discrimination".

Columnist Nat Hentoff was strongly opposed to abortion, and believed that a consistent life ethic should be the viewpoint of a genuine civil libertarian.
