= Supertask =

Infinitely many tasks in finite time

A supertask is an at least countably infinite sequence of operations that occur sequentially within a finite interval of time. Supertasks are called hypertasks when the number of operations is uncountable. A hypertask that includes one task for each ordinal number is called an ultratask. The term "supertask" was coined by the philosopher James F. Thomson, who devised Thomson's lamp. The term "hypertask" derives from Clark and Read in their paper of that name.

In this literature, a "task" is taken to take a finite amount of time, and at any point in time, at most one task can be in progress. This then shows that hypertasks and ultratasks are impossible, since a finite interval cannot contain an uncountable number of finite intervals. This is because a closed and bounded interval is second-countable.

== History ==
=== Zeno ===
==== Motion ====
The origin of the interest in supertasks is normally attributed to Zeno of Elea. Zeno claimed that motion was impossible. He argued as follows: suppose our burgeoning "mover", Achilles say, wishes to move from A to B. To achieve this he must traverse half the distance from A to B. To get from the midpoint of AB to B, Achilles must traverse half this distance, and so on and so forth. However many times he performs one of these "traversing" tasks, there is another one left for him to do before he arrives at B. Thus it follows, according to Zeno, that motion (travelling a non-zero distance in finite time) is a supertask. Zeno further argues that supertasks are not possible (how can this sequence be completed if for each traversing there is another one to come?). It follows that motion is impossible.

Zeno's argument takes the following form:

1. Motion is a supertask, because the completion of motion over any set distance involves an infinite number of steps
2. Supertasks are impossible
3. Therefore, motion is impossible

Most subsequent philosophers reject Zeno's bold conclusion in favor of common sense. Instead, they reverse the argument and take it as a proof by contradiction where the possibility of motion is taken for granted. They accept the possibility of motion and apply modus tollens (contrapositive) to Zeno's argument to reach the conclusion that either motion is not a supertask or not all supertasks are impossible.

==== Achilles and the tortoise ====
Zeno himself also discusses the notion of what he calls "Achilles and the tortoise". Suppose that Achilles is the fastest runner, and moves at a speed of 1 m/s. Achilles chases a tortoise, an animal renowned for being slow, that moves at 0.1 m/s. However, the tortoise starts 0.9 metres ahead. Common sense seems to decree that Achilles will catch up with the tortoise after exactly 1 second, but Zeno argues that this is not the case. He instead suggests that Achilles must inevitably come up to the point where the tortoise has started from, but by the time he has accomplished this, the tortoise will already have moved on to another point. This continues, and every time Achilles reaches the mark where the tortoise was, the tortoise will have reached a new point that Achilles will have to catch up with; while it begins with 0.9 metres, it becomes an additional 0.09 metres, then 0.009 metres, and so on, infinitely. While these distances will grow very small, they will remain finite, while Achilles' chasing of the tortoise will become an unending supertask. Much commentary has been made on this particular paradox; many assert that it finds a loophole in common sense.

=== Thomson ===
James F. Thomson believed that motion was not a supertask, and he emphatically denied that supertasks are possible. He considered a lamp that may either be on or off. At time t = 0 the lamp is off, and the switch is flipped on at t = 1/2; after that, the switch is flipped after waiting for half the time as before. Thomson asks what is the state at t = 1, when the switch has been flipped infinitely many times. He reasons that it cannot be on because there was never a time when it was not subsequently turned off, and vice versa, and reaches a contradiction. He concludes that supertasks are impossible.

=== Benacerraf ===
Paul Benacerraf believes that supertasks are at least logically possible despite Thomson's apparent contradiction. Benacerraf agrees with Thomson insofar as that the experiment he outlined does not determine the state of the lamp at t = 1. However he disagrees with Thomson that he can derive a contradiction from this, since the state of the lamp at t = 1 cannot be logically determined by the preceding states.

=== Modern literature ===
Most of the modern literature comes from the descendants of Benacerraf, those who tacitly accept the possibility of supertasks. Philosophers who reject their possibility tend not to reject them on grounds such as Thomson's but because they have qualms with the notion of infinity itself. Of course there are exceptions. For example, McLaughlin claims that Thomson's lamp is inconsistent if it is analyzed with internal set theory, a variant of real analysis.

==== Philosophy of mathematics ====
If supertasks are possible, then the truth or falsehood of unknown propositions of number theory, such as Goldbach's conjecture, or even undecidable propositions could be determined in a finite amount of time by a brute-force search of the set of all natural numbers. This would, however, be in contradiction with the Church–Turing thesis. Some have argued this poses a problem for intuitionism, since the intuitionist must distinguish between things that cannot in fact be proven (because they are too long or complicated; for example Boolos's "Curious Inference") but nonetheless are considered "provable", and those which are provable by infinite brute force in the above sense.

==== Physical possibility ====
Some have claimed, Thomson's lamp is physically impossible since it must have parts moving at speeds faster than the speed of light (e.g., the lamp switch). Adolf Grünbaum suggests that the lamp could have a strip of wire which, when lifted, disrupts the circuit and turns off the lamp; this strip could then be lifted by a smaller distance each time the lamp is to be turned off, maintaining a constant velocity.

However, such a design would ultimately fail, as eventually the distance between the contacts would be so small as to allow electrons to jump the gap, preventing the circuit from being broken at all. Still, for either a human or any device, to perceive or act upon the state of the lamp some measurement has to be done, for example the light from the lamp would have to reach an eye or a sensor.

Any such measurement will take a fixed frame of time, no matter how small and, therefore, at some point measurement of the state will be impossible. Since the state at t=1 cannot be determined even in principle, it is not meaningful to speak of the lamp being either on or off.

Other physically possible supertasks have been suggested. In one proposal, one person (or entity) counts upward from 1, taking an infinite amount of time, while another person observes this from a frame of reference where this occurs in a finite space of time. For the counter, this is not a supertask, but for the observer, it is. (This could theoretically occur due to time dilation, for example if the observer were falling into a black hole while observing a counter whose position is fixed relative to the singularity.)

Gustavo E. Romero in the paper 'The collapse of supertasks' maintains that any attempt to carry out a supertask will result in the formation of a black hole, making supertasks physically impossible.

==== Super Turing machines ====
The impact of supertasks on theoretical computer science has triggered some new and interesting work, for example Hamkins and Lewis – "Infinite Time Turing Machine".

== Prominent supertasks ==
=== Ross–Littlewood paradox ===
Suppose there is a jar capable of containing infinitely many marbles and an infinite collection of marbles labelled 1, 2, 3, and so on. At time t = 0, marbles 1 through 10 are placed in the jar and marble 1 is taken out. At t = 0.5, marbles 11 through 20 are placed in the jar and marble 2 is taken out; at t = 0.75, marbles 21 through 30 are put in the jar and marble 3 is taken out; and in general at time t = 1 − 0.5^{n}, marbles 10n + 1 through 10n + 10 are placed in the jar and marble n + 1 is taken out. How many marbles are in the jar at time t = 1?

One argument states that there should be infinitely many marbles in the jar, because at each step before t = 1 the number of marbles increases from the previous step and does so unboundedly. A second argument, however, shows that the jar is empty. Consider the following argument: if the jar is non-empty, then there must be a marble in the jar. Let us say that that marble is labeled with the number n. But at time t = 1 − 0.5^{n - 1}, the nth marble has been taken out, so marble n cannot be in the jar. This is a contradiction, so the jar must be empty.

=== Benardete's paradox ===
There has been considerable interest in J. A. Benardete’s “Paradox of the Gods”:

A man walks a mile from a point α. But there is an infinity of gods each of whom, unknown to the others, intends to obstruct him. One of them will raise a barrier to stop his further advance if he reaches the half-mile point, a second if he reaches the quarter-mile point, a third if he goes one-eighth of a mile, and so on ad infinitum. So he cannot even get started, because however short a distance he travels he will already have been stopped by a barrier. But in that case no barrier will rise, so that there is nothing to stop him setting off. He has been forced to stay where he is by the mere unfulfilled intentions of the gods.

— M. Clark, Paradoxes from A to Z

=== Grim Reaper paradox ===
Inspired by J. A. Benardete’s paradox regarding an infinite series of assassins, David Chalmers describes the paradox as follows:

There are countably many grim reapers, one for every positive integer. Grim reaper 1 is disposed to kill you with a scythe at 1pm, if and only if you are still alive then (otherwise his scythe remains immobile throughout), taking 30 minutes about it. Grim reaper 2 is disposed to kill you with a scythe at 12:30 pm, if and only if you are still alive then, taking 15 minutes about it. Grim reaper 3 is disposed to kill you with a scythe at 12:15 pm, and so on. You are still alive just before 12pm, you can only die through the motion of a grim reaper’s scythe, and once dead you stay dead. On the face of it, this situation seems conceivable — each reaper seems conceivable individually and intrinsically, and it seems reasonable to combine distinct individuals with distinct intrinsic properties into one situation. But a little reflection reveals that the situation as described is contradictory. I cannot survive to any moment past 12pm (a grim reaper would get me first), but I cannot be killed (for grim reaper n to kill me, I must have survived grim reaper n+1, which is impossible).

It has gained significance in philosophy via its use in arguing for a finite past, thereby bearing relevance to the Kalam cosmological argument.

=== Davies' super-machine ===
Proposed by E. Brian Davies, this is a machine that can, in the space of half an hour, create an exact replica of itself that is half its size and capable of twice its replication speed. This replica will in turn create an even faster version of itself with the same specifications, resulting in a supertask that finishes after an hour. If, additionally, the machines create a communication link between parent and child machine that yields successively faster bandwidth and the machines are capable of simple arithmetic, the machines can be used to perform brute-force proofs of unknown conjectures. However, Davies also points out that – due to fundamental properties of the real universe such as quantum mechanics, thermal noise and information theory – his machine cannot actually be built.

== See also ==
- Actual infinity – Concept in the philosophy of mathematics
- NP (complexity) – Complexity class used to classify decision problems
- Paradoxes of set theory
- Transcomputational problem – Class of computational problems
- Transfinite number – Number that is larger than all finite numbers
- Zeno machine – Hypothetical computational model
