= Judith Jarvis Thomson =

American philosopher (1929–2020)

- Judith Jarvis Thomson in 2005
- Born: Judith Jarvis; October 4, 1929; New York City, U.S.
- Died: November 20, 2020 (aged 91); Cambridge, Massachusetts, U.S.
- Spouse: James Thomson (m. 1962; div. 1980)

Education
- Education: Barnard College (BA); Cambridge University (BA, MA); Columbia University (PhD)

Philosophical work
- Era: Contemporary philosophy
- Region: Western philosophy
- School: Analytic philosophy
- Institutions: Barnard College; Boston University; Massachusetts Institute of Technology
- Doctoral students: Kathrin Koslicki
- Notable ideas: The trolley problem, Thomson's violinist argument in ethics concerning abortion

Judith Jarvis Thomson (October 4, 1929 – November 20, 2020) was an American philosopher who studied and worked on ethics and metaphysics. Her work ranges across a variety of fields, but she is most known for her work regarding the thought experiment titled the trolley problem and her writings on abortion. She is credited with naming, developing, and initiating the extensive literature on the trolley problem first posed by Philippa Foot which has found a wide range use since. Thomson also published a paper titled "A Defense of Abortion", which makes the argument that the procedure is morally permissible even if it is assumed that a fetus is a person with a right to life.

== Early life and education ==
Thomson was born Judith Jarvis in New York City, on October 4, 1929. Her mother Helen (Vostry) Jarvis (1898–1935) was an English teacher, and her father Theodore Richard Jarvis (1896–1984) was an accountant. Helen died from cancer when Judith was six, and on January 29, 1938 Theodore married Gertrude Rubin (1902–1982). Gertrude was Jewish and had two children.

Though she did not receive religious pressure from her parents, she officially converted to Judaism at age fourteen, when she was confirmed at Temple Israel in Manhattan.

Thomson graduated from Hunter College High School in January 1946. She received her bachelor's degree (BA) from Barnard College in 1950, a second BA at Newnham College, Cambridge in 1952, an MA from Cambridge in 1956, and a PhD from Columbia University in 1959. All of her degrees were in philosophy. Her supervisor at Cambridge was John Wisdom.

In 1960, Thomson began teaching at Barnard College. In 1962, she married James Thomson, who was a visiting professor at Columbia University. Judith and James spent the 1962–1963 academic year at Oxford, after which they moved to Boston. Judith taught for a year at Boston University and, in 1964, was appointed to the faculty at the Massachusetts Institute of Technology (MIT) where she was Laurence S. Rockefeller Professor of Philosophy. James was also appointed a professor of philosophy at MIT. The Thomsons divorced in 1980; they remained colleagues until James's death in 1984.

== Career ==
Thomson was a visiting professor at the University of Pittsburgh (1976), UC Berkeley School of Law (1983), and Yale Law School (1982, 1984, 1985). She held fellowships from the Fulbright Foundation (1950–1951), the American Association of University Women (1962–1963), the National Endowment for the Humanities (1978–1979, 1986–1987), the Guggenheim Foundation (1986–1987), and the Center for Advanced Study in Oslo, Norway (1996). In 1992–1993 she served as president of the American Philosophical Association (APA), Eastern Division. In 1999, she gave the Tanner Lectures on Human Values at Princeton University; her lecture was titled "Goodness and Advice". Thomson taught at MIT for the majority of her career, remaining there as professor emerita.

== Honors and awards ==
In 1989, Thomson was elected to the American Academy of Arts and Sciences.

In 2012, she was awarded the Quinn Prize by the American Philosophical Association.

In 2015, she was awarded an honorary doctorate by the University of Cambridge, and in 2016 she was awarded an honorary doctorate by Harvard University. In 2016, she was elected a Corresponding Fellow of the British Academy.

Thomson was elected a member of the American Philosophical Society in 2019.

== Philosophical views ==
Thomson's main areas of research were moral philosophy and metaphysics. In moral philosophy she made significant contributions to meta-ethics, normative ethics, and applied ethics.

"A Defense of Abortion" (1971) introduced one thought experiment for which Thomson is especially well known. Published in 1971, Thomson's work on abortion is historically connected to and located just prior to the court case of Roe v. Wade (1973). The paper asks the reader to imagine that her circulatory system has, without her consent, been connected to that of a famous violinist whose life she must sustain for nine months. The hypothetical posed by Thomson notably redirects philosophical attention from the rights of the fetus to those of the pregnant woman. Specifically, her argument accepts that a fetus is a person, moving past any discussion which revolved around that topic. Instead, Thomson claims that the bodily autonomy of the woman supersedes any rights of the fetus. This argument has been widely discussed since, so much so that it is accepted in some anti-abortion circles to have changed the way in which abortion is debated.

In regard to ethical theories, Thomson was opposed to consequentialist, hedonist, and subjectivist perspectives. Her work relied on specific elements of deontological argumentation.

In metaphysics, Thomson focused on questions regarding the relationship between actions and events, and between time and physical parts.

She also made significant contributions on the topic of privacy.

== Death ==
Thomson died on November 20, 2020, at the age of 91. She was buried beside her former husband in Mount Auburn Cemetery.

== Selected publications ==
- Thomson, Judith Jarvis (1971). "A Defense of Abortion" (PDF). Philosophy & Public Affairs. 1 (1): 47–66. ISSN 0048-3915. JSTOR 2265091.
- Thomson, Judith Jarvis (1975). "The Right to Privacy". Philosophy & Public Affairs. 4 (4): 295–314. ISSN 0048-3915. JSTOR 2265075.
- Thomson, Judith Jarvis (1976). "Killing, Letting Die, and the Trolley Problem" (PDF). The Monist. 59 (2): 204–217. doi:10.5840/monist197659224. PMID 11662247.
- Thomson, Judith Jarvis (1977). Acts and Other Events. Ithaca, New York: Cornell University Press. ISBN 9780801410505. OCLC 655087495.
- Thomson, Judith Jarvis (1986). Rights, Restitution, and Risk: Essays in Moral Theory. Cambridge, Massachusetts: Harvard University Press. ISBN 9780674769809. OCLC 1151158974.
- Thomson, Judith Jarvis (May 1985). "The Trolley Problem" (PDF). Yale Law Journal. 94 (6): 1395–1415. doi:10.2307/796133. JSTOR 796133.
- Thomson, Judith Jarvis, ed. (1987). On Being and Saying: Essays for Richard Cartwright. Cambridge, Massachusetts: MIT Press. ISBN 978-0262200639.
- Thomson, Judith Jarvis (1990). The Realm of Rights. Cambridge, Massachusetts: Harvard University Press. ISBN 9780674749481. OCLC 1151074383.
- Thomson, Judith Jarvis (January 1994). "Goodness and Utilitarianism". Proceedings and Addresses of the American Philosophical Association. 67 (4): 5–21. doi:10.2307/3130740. JSTOR 3130740.
- Harman, Gilbert; Thomson, Judith Jarvis (1996). Moral Relativism and Moral Objectivity. Cambridge, Massachusetts: Blackwell. OCLC 1036773391.
- Thomson, Judith Jarvis (2001). Goodness and Advice. Princeton, New Jersey: Princeton University Press. ISBN 978-1-4008-2472-4. OCLC 362799240.

== See also ==
- American philosophy
- Fact and Value: Essays on Ethics and Metaphysics for Judith Jarvis Thomson
