= Don Marquis (philosopher) =

American philosopher (1935–2022)

- Born: Donald Bagley Marquis; November 2, 1935; Elkhart, Indiana, U.S.
- Died: September 13, 2022 (aged 86)
- Occupations: Philosopher; academic
- Spouse: Janet Goldsberry (m. 1958; div. 1985)
- Partner: Lois Clark (2003–2022)
- Children: 2

Education
- Education: Indiana University (AB, MA, PhD); University of Pittsburgh (MA)

Philosophical work
- Institutions: University of Kansas
- Main interests: Deontology; ethics; medical ethics
- Notable ideas: "Deprivation argument" against abortion

Donald Bagley Marquis (/ˈmɑːrkwɪs/ MAR-kwis; November 2, 1935 – September 13, 2022) was an American philosopher and deontologist whose main academic interests were in ethics and medical ethics. Marquis was an Emeritus Professor of Philosophy at the University of Kansas until his death.

== Biography ==
Marquis was born on November 2, 1935, in Elkhart, Indiana, to Donald and Eleanor Marquis. He earned an A.B. in Anatomy and Physiology from Indiana University in 1957. After receiving an M.A. in History from the University of Pittsburgh in 1962, Marquis returned to Indiana University to study philosophy. He received an M.A. in History and Philosophy of Science from Indiana in 1964 and a Ph.D. in Philosophy in 1970. He taught at the University of Kansas from 1967 until his retirement in 2016. During the 2007/08 academic year, Marquis held the Laurance S. Rockefeller Visiting Professorship for Distinguished Teaching at the University Center for Human Values at Princeton University.

Marquis was best known for his paper "Why Abortion Is Immoral", which appeared in The Journal of Philosophy in April 1989. This paper has been reprinted over 80 times and is widely cited in the philosophical debate over abortion. The main argument in the paper is sometimes known as the "deprivation argument" since a central premise is that abortion deprives an embryo or fetus of a "future like ours".

In his personal life, Marquis was a piano player, singer, and appreciator of classical music and opera. He married Janet Goldsberry in 1958, and they divorced in 1985. He had a long-term relationship, lasting 19 years, with Lois Clark, which ended with her death in February 2022. After a brief illness, Marquis died on September 13, 2022 at the age of 86. He was survived by his two children. He was an atheist.
