= Zeno's paradoxes =

Set of philosophical problems that involve mostly motions

Zeno's paradoxes are a series of philosophical arguments presented by the ancient Greek philosopher Zeno of Elea (c. 490–430 BC), primarily known through the works of Plato, Aristotle, and later commentators like Simplicius of Cilicia. Zeno devised these paradoxes to support his teacher Parmenides's philosophy of monism, which posits that despite people's sensory experiences, reality is singular and unchanging. The paradoxes famously challenge the notions of plurality (the existence of many things), motion, space, and time by suggesting they lead to logical contradictions.

Zeno's work, primarily known from second-hand accounts since his original texts are lost, comprises forty "paradoxes of plurality," which argue against the coherence of believing in multiple existences, and several arguments against motion and change. Of these, only a few are definitively known today, including the renowned "Achilles Paradox", which illustrates the problematic concept of infinite divisibility in space and time. In this paradox, Zeno argues that a swift runner like Achilles cannot overtake a slower moving tortoise with a head start, because the distance between them can be infinitely subdivided, implying Achilles would require an infinite number of steps to catch the tortoise.

These paradoxes have stirred extensive philosophical and mathematical discussion throughout history, particularly regarding the nature of infinity and the continuity of space and time. Initially, Aristotle's interpretation, suggesting a potential rather than actual infinity, was widely accepted. However, modern solutions leveraging the mathematical framework of calculus have provided a different perspective, highlighting Zeno's significant early insight into the complexities of infinity and continuous motion. In the realm of metaphysics, evidence indicates that the "skeptical method" which Zeno adopted to analyze his paradoxes, also influenced the manner in which Immanuel Kant attempted to resolve the paradoxes which were identified within his own antinomies. Zeno's paradoxes remain a pivotal reference point in the philosophical and mathematical exploration of reality, motion, and the infinite, influencing both ancient thought and modern scientific understanding.

== History ==
The origins of the paradoxes are somewhat unclear, but they are generally thought to have been developed to support Parmenides' doctrine of monism, that all of reality is one, and that all change is impossible, that is, that nothing ever changes in location or in any other respect. Diogenes Laërtius, citing Favorinus, says that Zeno's teacher Parmenides was the first to introduce the paradox of Achilles and the tortoise. But in a later passage, Laërtius attributes the origin of the paradox to Zeno, explaining that Favorinus disagrees. Modern academics attribute the paradox to Zeno.

Many of these paradoxes argue that contrary to the evidence of one's senses, motion is nothing but an illusion. In Plato's Parmenides (128a–d), Zeno is characterized as taking on the project of creating these paradoxes because other philosophers claimed paradoxes arise when considering Parmenides' view. Zeno's arguments may then be early examples of a method of proof called reductio ad absurdum, also known as proof by contradiction. Thus Plato has Zeno say the purpose of the paradoxes "is to show that their hypothesis that existences are many, if properly followed up, leads to still more absurd results than the hypothesis that they are one." Plato has Socrates claim that Zeno and Parmenides were essentially arguing exactly the same point. They are also credited as a source of the dialectic method used by Socrates.

== Paradoxes ==
Some of Zeno's nine surviving paradoxes (preserved in Aristotle's Physics and Simplicius's commentary thereon) are essentially equivalent to one another. Aristotle offered a response to some of them. Popular literature often misrepresents Zeno's arguments. For example, Zeno is often said to have argued that the sum of an infinite number of terms must itself be infinite–with the result that not only the time, but also the distance to be travelled, become infinite. However, none of the original ancient sources has Zeno discussing any infinite sum. Simplicius has Zeno saying "it is impossible to traverse an infinite number of things in a finite time". This presents Zeno's problem not with finding the sum, but rather with finishing a task with an infinite number of steps: how can one ever get from A to B, if an infinite number of (non-instantaneous) events can be identified that need to precede the arrival at B, and one cannot reach even the beginning of a "last event"?

=== Paradoxes of motion ===
Three of the strongest and most famous—that of Achilles and the tortoise, the Dichotomy argument, and that of an arrow in flight—are presented in detail below.

==== Dichotomy paradox ====
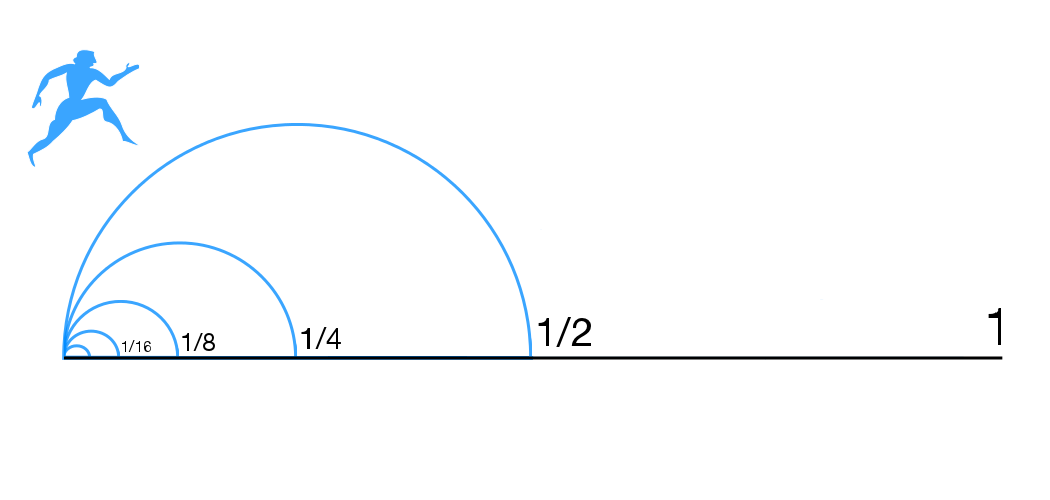
The dichotomy

That which is in locomotion must arrive at the half-way stage before it arrives at the goal.

— as recounted by Aristotle, Physics VI:9, 239b10

Suppose Atalanta wishes to walk to the end of a path. Before she can get there, she must get halfway there. Before she can get halfway there, she must get a quarter of the way there. Before traveling a quarter, she must travel one-eighth; before an eighth, one-sixteenth; and so on.

The resulting sequence can be represented as:
$$\left\{ \cdots,  \frac{1}{16},  \frac{1}{8},  \frac{1}{4},  \frac{1}{2},  1 \right\}$$

This description requires one to complete an infinite number of tasks, which Zeno maintains is an impossibility.

This sequence also presents a second problem in that it contains no first distance to run, for any possible (finite) first distance could be divided in half, and hence would not be first after all. Hence, the trip cannot even begin. The paradoxical conclusion then would be that travel over any finite distance can be neither completed nor begun, and so all motion must be an illusion.

This argument is called the "Dichotomy" because it involves repeatedly splitting a distance into two parts. An example with the original sense can be found in an asymptote. It is also known as the Race Course paradox.

==== Achilles and the tortoise ====
Achilles and the tortoise

In a race, the quickest runner can never overtake the slowest, since the pursuer must first reach the point whence the pursued started, so that the slower must always hold a lead.

— as recounted by Aristotle, Physics VI:9, 239b15

In the paradox of Achilles and the tortoise, Achilles is in a footrace with a tortoise. Achilles allows the tortoise a head start of 100 meters, for example. Suppose that each racer starts running at some constant speed, one faster than the other. After some finite time, Achilles will have run 100 meters, bringing him to the tortoise's starting point. During this time, the tortoise has run a much shorter distance, say 2 meters. It will then take Achilles some further time to run that distance, by which time the tortoise will have advanced farther; and then more time still to reach this third point, while the tortoise moves ahead. Thus, whenever Achilles arrives somewhere the tortoise has been, he still has some distance to go before he can even reach the tortoise. As Aristotle noted, this argument is similar to the Dichotomy. It lacks, however, the apparent conclusion of motionlessness.

==== Arrow paradox ====
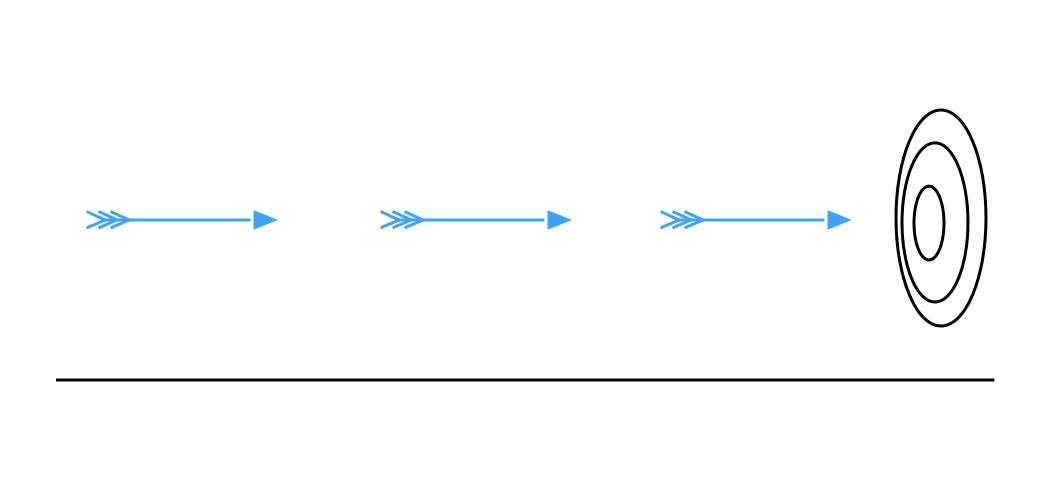
The arrow

if everything when it occupies an equal space is at rest, and if that which is in locomotion is always occupying such a space at any moment, the flying arrow is therefore motionless.

— as recounted by Aristotle, Physics VI:9, 239b5

In the arrow paradox, Zeno states that for motion to occur, an object must change the position which it occupies. He gives an example of an arrow in flight. He states that at any one (durationless) instant of time, the arrow is neither moving to where it is, nor to where it is not. It cannot move to where it is not, because no time elapses for it to move there; it cannot move to where it is, because it is already there. In other words, at every instant of time there is no motion occurring. If everything is motionless at every instant, and time is entirely composed of instants, then motion is impossible.

Whereas the first two paradoxes divide space, this paradox starts by dividing time—and not into segments, but into points.

=== Other paradoxes ===
Aristotle gives three other paradoxes:

==== Paradox of place ====
From Aristotle:

If everything that exists has a place, place too will have a place, and so on ad infinitum.

==== Paradox of the grain of millet ====
Description of the paradox from the Routledge Dictionary of Philosophy:

The argument is that a single grain of millet makes no sound upon falling, but a thousand grains make a sound. Hence a thousand nothings become something, an absurd conclusion.

Aristotle's response:

Zeno's reasoning is false when he argues that there is no part of the millet that does not make a sound: for there is no reason why any such part should not in any length of time fail to move the air that the whole bushel moves in falling. In fact it does not of itself move even such a quantity of the air as it would move if this part were by itself: for no part even exists otherwise than potentially.

Description from Nick Huggett:

This is a Parmenidean argument that one cannot trust one's sense of hearing. Aristotle's response seems to be that even inaudible sounds can add to an audible sound.

==== The moving rows (or stadium) ====
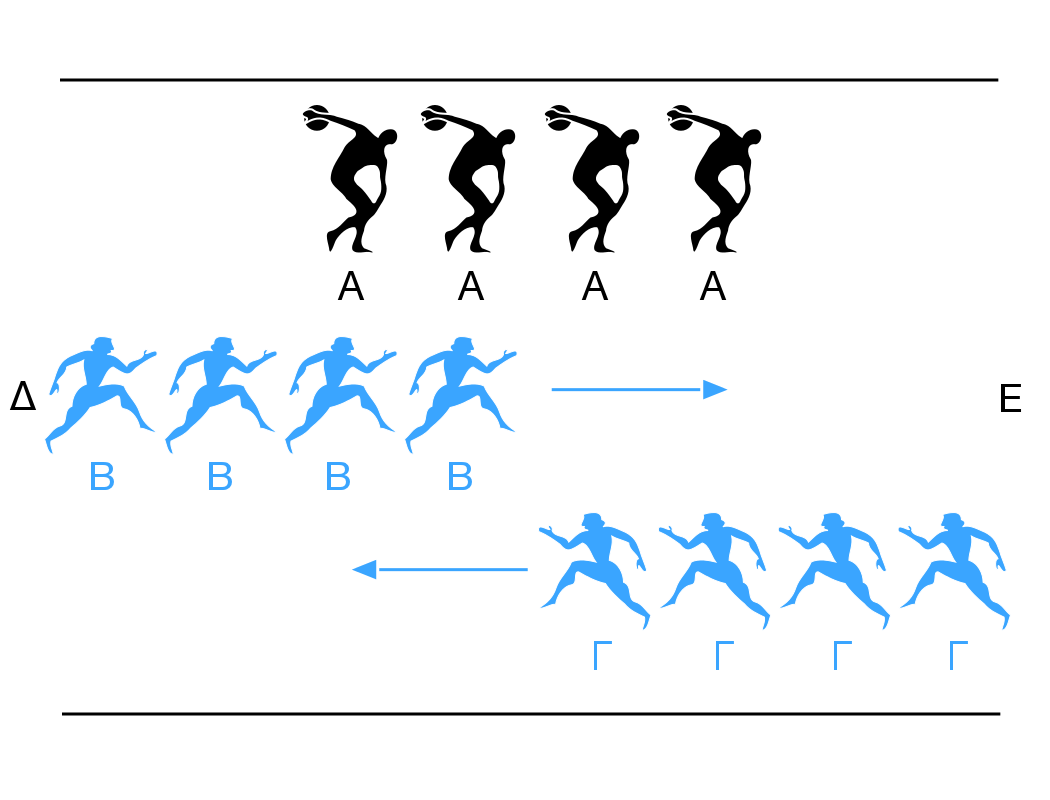
The moving rows

From Aristotle:

... concerning the two rows of bodies, each row being composed of an equal number of bodies of equal size, passing each other on a race-course as they proceed with equal velocity in opposite directions, the one row originally occupying the space between the goal and the middle point of the course and the other that between the middle point and the starting-post. This...involves the conclusion that half a given time is equal to double that time.

An expanded account of Zeno's arguments, as presented by Aristotle, is given in Simplicius's commentary On Aristotle's Physics.

According to Angie Hobbs of The University of Sheffield, this paradox is intended to be considered together with the paradox of Achilles and the Tortoise, problematizing the concept of discrete space & time where the other problematizes the concept of infinitely divisible space & time.

== Proposed solutions ==
=== In classical antiquity ===
According to Simplicius, Diogenes the Cynic said nothing upon hearing Zeno's arguments, but stood up and walked, in order to demonstrate the falsity of Zeno's conclusions. To fully solve any of the paradoxes, however, one needs to show what is wrong with the argument, not just the conclusions. Throughout history several solutions have been proposed, among the earliest recorded being those of Aristotle and Archimedes.

Aristotle remarked that as the distance decreases, the time needed to cover those distances also decreases, so that the time needed also becomes increasingly small. Aristotle also distinguished "things infinite in respect of divisibility" (such as a unit of space that can be mentally divided into ever smaller units while remaining spatially the same) from things (or distances) that are infinite in extension ("with respect to their extremities"). Aristotle's objection to the arrow paradox was that "Time is not composed of indivisible nows any more than any other magnitude is composed of indivisibles." Thomas Aquinas, commenting on Aristotle's objection, wrote "Instants are not parts of time, for time is not made up of instants any more than a magnitude is made of points, as we have already proved. Hence it does not follow that a thing is not in motion in a given time, just because it is not in motion in any instant of that time."

=== In modern mathematics ===
Some mathematicians and historians, such as Carl Benjamin Boyer, hold that Zeno's paradoxes are simply mathematical problems, for which modern calculus provides a mathematical solution. Infinite processes remained theoretically troublesome in mathematics until the late 19th century. With the definition of limit, Karl Weierstrass and Augustin-Louis Cauchy developed a rigorous formulation of the logic and calculus evolved. These works resolved the mathematics involving infinite processes.

Some philosophers, however, say that Zeno's paradoxes and their variations (see Thomson's lamp) remain relevant metaphysical problems. While mathematics can calculate where and when the moving Achilles will overtake the Tortoise of Zeno's paradox, philosophers such as Kevin Brown and Francis Moorcroft hold that mathematics does not address the central point in Zeno's argument, and that solving the mathematical issues does not solve every issue the paradoxes raise. Brown concludes "Given the history of 'final resolutions', from Aristotle onwards, it's probably foolhardy to think we've reached the end. It may be that Zeno's arguments on motion, because of their simplicity and universality, will always serve as a kind of 'Rorschach image' onto which people can project their most fundamental phenomenological concerns (if they have any)."

==== Henri Bergson ====
An alternative conclusion, proposed by Henri Bergson in his 1896 book Matter and Memory, is that, while the path is divisible, the motion is not.

==== Peter Lynds ====
In 2003, Peter Lynds argued that all of Zeno's motion paradoxes are resolved by the conclusion that instants in time and instantaneous magnitudes do not physically exist. Lynds argues that an object in relative motion cannot have an instantaneous or determined relative position (for if it did, it could not be in motion), and so cannot have its motion fractionally dissected as if it does, as is assumed by the paradoxes. Nick Huggett argues that Zeno is assuming the conclusion when he says that objects that occupy the same space as they do at rest must be at rest.

==== Bertrand Russell ====
Based on the work of Georg Cantor, Bertrand Russell offered a solution to the paradoxes, what is known as the "at-at theory of motion". It agrees that there can be no motion "during" a durationless instant, and contends that all that is required for motion is that the arrow be at one point at one time, at another point another time, and at appropriate points between those two points for intervening times. In this view motion is just change in position over time.

==== Hermann Weyl ====
Another proposed solution is to question one of the assumptions Zeno used in his paradoxes (particularly the Dichotomy), which is that between any two different points in space (or time), there is always another point. Without this assumption there are only a finite number of distances between two points, hence there is no infinite sequence of movements, and the paradox is resolved. According to Hermann Weyl, the assumption that space is made of finite and discrete units is subject to a further problem, given by the "tile argument" or "distance function problem". According to this, the length of the hypotenuse of a right angled triangle in discretized space is always equal to the sum of the length of the two sides, in contradiction to geometry. Jean Paul Van Bendegem has argued that the Tile Argument can be resolved, and that discretization can therefore remove the paradox.

== Applications ==
=== Quantum Zeno effect ===
In 1977, physicists E. C. George Sudarshan and B. Misra discovered that the dynamical evolution (transitions between discrete states) of a quantum system can be inhibited through measurement of the system. This effect is usually called the quantum Zeno effect as it is strongly reminiscent of Zeno's arrow paradox. This effect was first theorized in 1958.

=== Zeno behaviour ===
In the field of verification and design of timed and hybrid systems, the system behaviour is called Zeno if it includes an infinite number of discrete steps in a finite amount of time. Some formal verification techniques exclude these behaviours from analysis, if they are not equivalent to non-Zeno behaviour. In systems design these behaviours will also often be excluded from system models, since they cannot be implemented with a digital controller.

== Similar paradoxes ==
=== School of Names ===
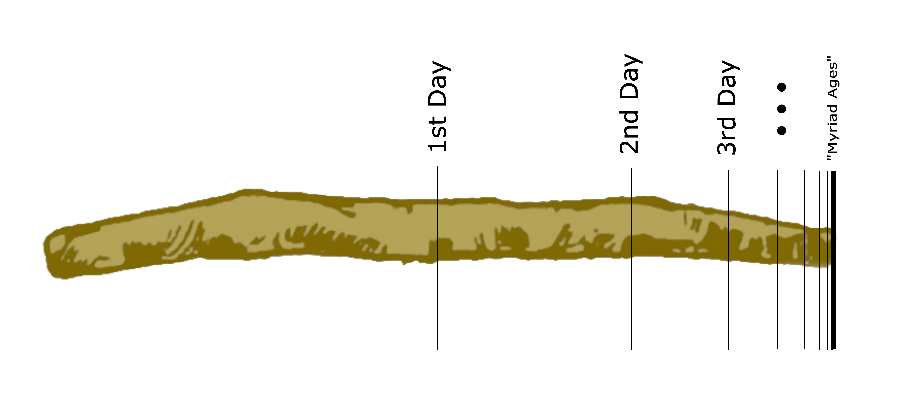
Diagram of Hui Shi's stick paradox

Roughly contemporaneously during the Warring States period (475–221 BCE), ancient Chinese philosophers from the School of Names, a school of thought similarly concerned with logic and dialectics, developed paradoxes similar to those of Zeno. The works of the School of Names have largely been lost, with the exception of portions of the Gongsun Longzi. The second of the Ten Theses of Hui Shi suggests knowledge of infinitesimals: That which has no thickness cannot be piled up; yet it is a thousand li in dimension. Among the many puzzles of his recorded in the Zhuangzi is one very similar to Zeno's Dichotomy:

"If from a stick a foot long you every day take the half of it, in a myriad ages it will not be exhausted."

— Zhuangzi, chapter 33 (Legge translation)

The Mohist canon appears to propose a solution to this paradox by arguing that in moving across a measured length, the distance is not covered in successive fractions of the length, but in one stage. Due to the lack of surviving works from the School of Names, most of the other paradoxes listed are difficult to interpret.

== In popular culture ==
"What the Tortoise Said to Achilles", written in 1895 by Lewis Carroll, describes a paradoxical infinite regress argument in the realm of pure logic. It uses Achilles and the Tortoise as characters in a clear reference to Zeno's paradox of Achilles.

== See also ==
- Incommensurable magnitudes
- Infinite regress
- Philosophy of space and time
- Renormalization
- Ross–Littlewood paradox
- Supertask
- Zeno machine
- List of paradoxes
