= Soulcatcher =

Shamanic amulet

A Tlingit soulcatcher, made by Heendei, of the Raven moiety and the Deisheetaan clan.

A soulcatcher or soul catcher (haboolm ksinaalgat, 'keeper of breath') is an amulet (aatxasxw) used by the shaman (halayt) of the Pacific Northwest Coast of British Columbia and Alaska. It is believed by Tsimshian that all soulcatchers were constructed by the Tsimshian tribe, and traded to the other tribes.

== Construction ==
Soulcatchers were constructed of a tube of bear femur, incised on one or both sides, and often ornamented with abalone shell. Bears had powerful shamanic connotations among the people of the Northwest Coast.

Soulcatchers were decorated with a sisiutl-like animal: a land-otter or bear head at both ends of the tube, and an anthropomorphic face in the middle. This form may have represented the ability to shift shapes, or the mythological land-otter canoe, implying the ability to travel between the three realms: air/god realm (kijek), earth/human/animal realm (takijek), and water/spirit realm (tekijek). The land-otter was the source of all shamanic power.

A shaman's helper spirit may have resided in the central head.

The soulcatcher was plugged at both ends with shredded cedar bark, to contain the lost soul, or to hold a malevolent spirit "sucked out" of a patient. The amulet was usually worn as a necklace. Soulcatchers ranged in length from 16 cm to 21.6 cm (6 5/8" to 8 1/2").

There are a few examples of wood soulcatchers, and a Haida example covered with copper sheeting.

== Use ==
Sickness incurable by secular (herbal) means was believed to be caused by "soul loss" through:

- Dreaming, which was thought to be the soul leaving the body and traveling to the spirit world. If the soul was unable to return to the body by morning (due to disorientation or supernatural interference), chronic illness would follow.
- Being frightened out of the body
- Being enticed out by witchcraft

To cure the patient, the shaman would wear the soulcatcher as a necklace. He would then travel to the spirit world by calling helper spirits using trance music, employing helper-spirit masks, and magical implements such as staffs. Shaman might also work in groups, constructing a representation of a shaman's Land-Otter canoe and "dantsikw" spirit boards (see sisiutl) as a vehicle to travel to the spirit world. Once the errant soul was located, the shaman would "suck" the soul into the soulcatcher, and return to the patient. The soul would then be "blown" back into the patient.

Another use of the soulcatcher was to suck malevolent spirits out of a patient.

== See also ==
- Body swap
- Soul dualism
- Soul loss
