= Lingshan Temple =

- Traditional Chinese: 靈山寺
- Simplified Chinese: 灵山寺
- Literal meaning: Temple of Spirit Mountain; Soulful Mountain Temple
Transcriptions
Standard Mandarin
- Hanyu Pinyin: Língshān Sì
- Wade–Giles: Ling-shan Ssu

Lingshan or Ling-shan Temple may refer to:

- Lingshan Temple (Haikou), in Meilan District, Haikou, Hainan
- Lingshan Temple (Shantou), in Chaoyang District of Shantou, Guangdong, China
- Lingshan Temple (Xinyang), in Xinyang, Henan, China
- Lingshan Temple (Luoyang), in Luoyang, Henan, China
- Lingshan Temple (Qi County), in Qi County, Henan, China
- Lingshan Temple (Anyang), in Anyang, Henan, China
- Lingshan Temple (Mianning County), in Mianning County, Sichuan, China
- Lingshan Temple (Chaoyang County), in Chaoyang County, Liaoning, China
- Lingshan Temple (Huludao), in Huludao, Liaoning, China
- Lingshan Temple (Liupanshui), in Liupanshui, Guizhou, China
- Lingshan Temple (Guangde County), in Guangde County, Anhui, China
- Lingshan Temple (Tai'an), in Tai'an, Shandong, China
- Lingshan Temple (Lishui), in Lishui, Zhejiang, China
- Lingshan Temple (Kaihua County), in Kaihua County, Zhejiang, China
- Lingshan Temple (Liuqiu) on Liuqiu Island, off Taiwan
