= History of the location of the soul =

Search for an immaterial soul identity and its location

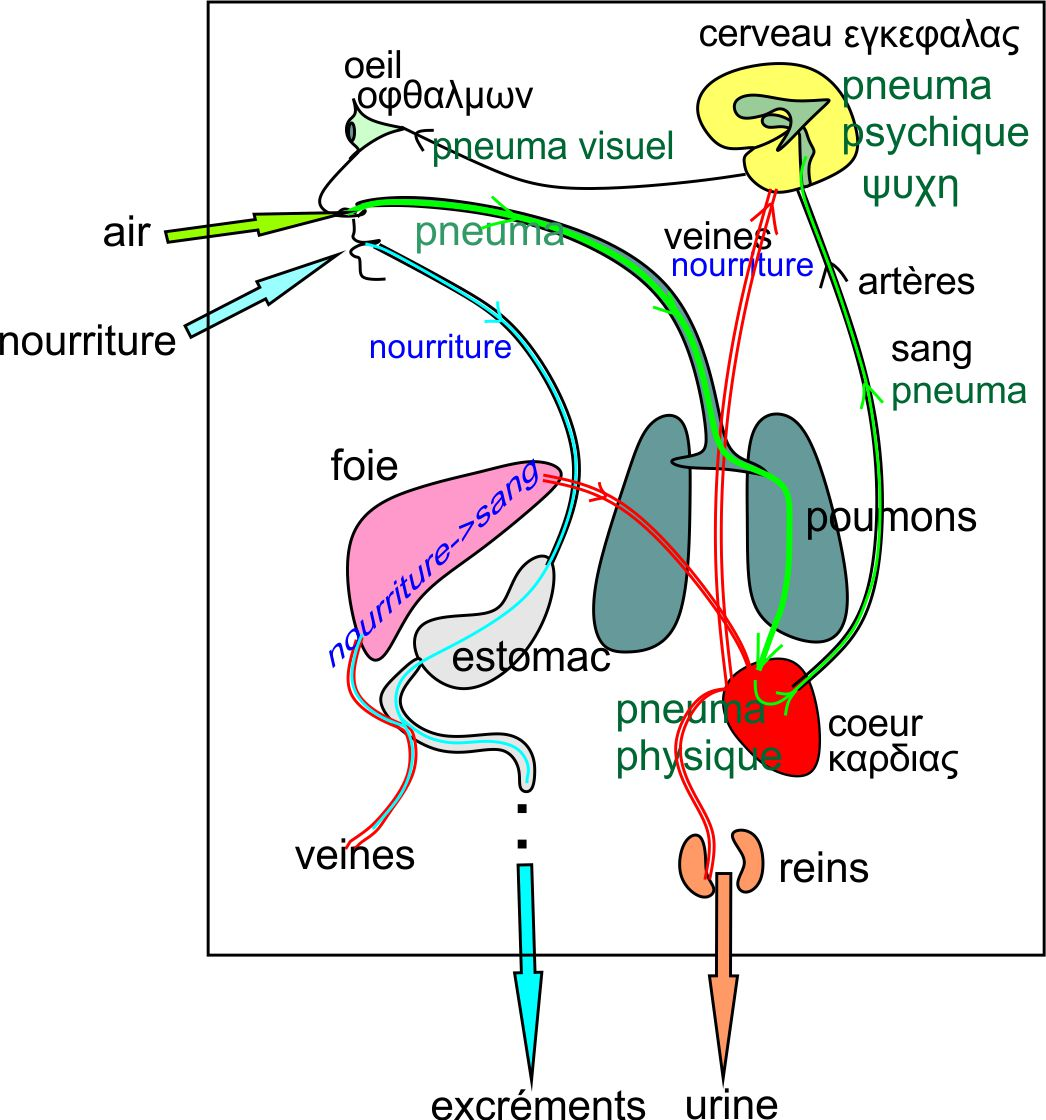
Galen's description of the body told through "pneuma" or what was understood to be the soul

Throughout history, different belief systems have offered numerous unique rationale on where the soul is physically or spiritually located. The search for a hypothetical soul and its location have been a subject of much speculation. In early medicine and anatomy, the location of the soul was hypothesized to be located within the body. Aristotle and Plato understood the soul as an incorporeal form but closely related to the physical world. The Hippocratic Corpus chronicles the evolution of thought that the soul is located within the body and is manifested in diseased conditions. Later, Galen explicitly used Plato's description of the incorporeal soul to physical locations in the body. The logical (λογιστικός) in the brain, the spirited (θυμοειδές) in the heart, and the appetitive (ἐπιθυμητικόν) in the liver. Da Vinci had a similar approach to Galen, locating the soul, or senso comune, as well as the imprensiva (intellect) and memoria (memory) in different ventricles of the brain. Today neuroscientists and other fields of science that deal with the body and the mind, such as psychology, bridge the gap between what is physical and what is incorporeal.

== Ancient Egypt ==
The earliest known theory pertaining to the location of the soul is thought to come from Ancient Egypt during the third millennium BCE. Ancient Egyptian civilizations held the belief that the soul was composed of several parts: the Ba, Ka, Ren, Sheut, and the Ib. Furthermore, the Ib was located in the heart, and considered the vital force that brought human beings to life. Because the Ib was also responsible for thoughts and feelings, its status determined a person's fate upon their death. This took place during a heart weighing ceremony, in which Anubis would feed the heaviest hearts to the demon Ammit. It is believed that the Ancient Egyptian view of the heart formed the foundation for later theories on the location for the human soul.

== Hippocratic Corpus ==
The Hippocratic Corpus and its many treatises demonstrate the evolving knowledge of the body and how to treat ailments in reference to the soul. In the treatise on Diseases II, physicians are warned about the illnesses associated with air in the body, particularly in the lungs causing the patient to cough vigorously and hoarsely: "διαπνειν δοΚει δια στηθεοζ", translated as "the patient is breathing through their lungs". The next lines detail that this was an extremely serious condition for the patient and a cause for great concern. To remedy air in the lungs, the physician was advised to clear the lungs of as much air as possible using a bladder and hose.

Later in the Corpus, during or after the life of Aristotle on Disease IV, pneuma, or air is presented as a warming life force. In the treatise On the Sacred Disease air is described as not being located in just the lungs but in the entire body and circulating it giving life. According to the treatise the first location of the air is to the brain and it describes that medical conditions of the brain can be caused by a blockage of air flow there. Aristotle in his works refers to pneuma being directly related to the soul.

== Plato ==
Plato, the student of Socrates and teacher to Aristotle, suggests in Timmeus that the human soul was divine in nature, and that it entered the human body after separating from a spiritual origin that it would return to upon death. Furthermore, Plato believed the soul to be a tripartite one, composed of the logos, the thymos, and the epithemitikon. In order to protect the immortal soul from contamination, the perishable souls, the thymos and the epithemitikon, were separated from the head by the neck. The thymos, responsible for feelings such as rage, bravery, and hope, was located in the chest cavity. The epithemitikon, which controlled desires and unconscious thought, was located near the umbilicus, farthest from the logos. The brain, then, was the seat of all rational thought, the logos, and the true location of the immortal and divine soul.

== Aristotle ==
In De Spiritu Aristotle links the idea of pneuma and the soul directly together saying that "Pneuma is connected to the soul" that, "it is the souls primary driving force".

Aristotle in De Anima (On the Soul) suggests that organs of the body are required for the soul to interact with. Unlike Plato, Aristotle believed the soul's existence was not separate from the human body, thus the soul could not be immortal. Similarly to Plato, however, Aristotle believed the soul is composed of three parts: the vegetative, sensitive, and rational. Growth and reproduction is a result of the vegetative soul, and is found in all organisms. The sensitive soul, however, allows for sensation and movement in humans and animals. The third, the rational, is exclusive to humans, and allows for rational thought.

In book II, Aristotle states that, the soul is the part of the human that allows its entire being, that one can't exist without the other and they complement each other. In book III he provides an example of his theory of the soul and makes the correlation between the physical sensations of light the phaos in the body and the incorporeal imaginations phantasia. Aristotle imagined the soul as in part, within the human body and in part an incorporeal imagination. In Aristotle's treatise On Youth, Old Age, Life and Death, and Respiration, Aristotle explicitly states that while the soul has an incorporeal form, there is a physical area of the soul in the human body, the heart. Aristotle states the heart is the location of the 5 sensations of the body and is directly responsible for respiration and the sustenance of life. The heart is of further importance as it is all animal's area of heating the body and blood and the creation of pneuma, or life force that animates the body. To Aristotle this explains why dead things become cold, do not breathe, and that their souls have left them. Because the heart is the location of the human soul and life force, it is the organ of utmost importance in Aristotelian physiology. Correspondingly, the heart is the first organ to appear during embryonic development.

== Epicurus ==
Epicurus, with a view reflecting that of the Greek philosopher Democritus, suggested that the human soul was corporeal and composed of small particles spread out within the entire body. Epicurus believed that the separation of these small particles resulted in a loss of sensation, and consequently, death. Like Aristotle, Epicurus was of the opinion that the soul was a result of the body, making it mortal and perishable.

== Herophilus ==
Image depicting the third and fourth ventricle–Herophilus thought as these were the seat of the soul

In the third century Herophilos in Alexandria was one of the first anatomists to perform dissections of the human body for the brief time that it was legal. Herophilos discovered many novel aspects of the human body, specifically in the brain and associated tissues. The works of Herophilus were lost in the fire of Alexandria of 391 AD and therefore we only know of his existence in other surviving works. Most of the medical terminology and works are recorded in the books by Galen and therefore the reliability that Herophilus actually thought to the soul to be in the body is in question.

According to the recordings of his work, Herophilus thought that the location of the soul is in the brain, specifically in the ventricles of the brain, the 4 open cavities in the innermost parts of the brain. Herophilos describes the distinction of the soul and natures as being intertwined within the body and while are separate things, cannot exist without the other. Herophilos in his dissections discovered the differences between nerves and blood vessels. Nerves carried the pneuma or soul to animate the body and the vessels being related to nature. Following the lines tracks of the nerves through the body he saw that they all converge in the brain, and by Herophilus' reasoning the ventricles of the brain. Of particular importance to the location of the soul was the 4th ventricle of the brain.

Herophilus observed that there existed two types of nerves, those that functioned in motor activity and those that take in sensory information. Because all nerves are a continuation of the spinal cord and the cerebellum, which are located most closely to the 4th ventricle, it stood to reason that the center of movement and perception, and thus the soul, must be located in the 4th ventricle.

In his treatise, On Anatomy, pneuma was inhaled by the lungs and sent to the brain ventricles via the vessels of the body where the brain would convert it into what he called "psychic pneuma", or the soul, and produce thought, motion and all other animations of the body. Herophilus discovered the bumpy aspect of the walls of the ventricles of the brain that he called the choroid plexus and which was thought to be the interaction of the brain with the pneuma to create the psychic pneuma and then these were sent out via the nervous system. He further identified 8 of the cerebral nerves and tracked them to the spinal cord and throughout the body. The choroid plexus is the term still used today and are the structures that produce cerebrospinal fluid.

== Galen ==
Galen was one of the most foundational physicians in history and is known for careful and detailed vivisection and dissections of animals that was foundational to modern medicine. Galen was known for his treatises on being both a physician and a philosopher and was well versed in the works of Plato. His medical anatomy is described through the use of Plato's incorporeal ideals of the soul. The heart was the spirited, the liver the appetitive, and the brain the logical. Later on, Galen moved to Rome where he carried out vivisections on pigs and monkeys to observe their pulmonary circulation. He was the first scientist to distinguish the physiological difference between the arteries and the veins. Galen restricted himself to the scientific explanation of blood flow and respiration.

Galen states in On Respiration and the Arteries "one must determine by dissection that the number and nature of the structures that connect the heart to the brain" and it was observed that when these nerves were cut in animals they would lose their voice and when veins were cut they would bleed, but retain their voice. Therefore, the brain does not need the heart to feel or create sensations and the heart does not need the brain to move. Galen recognized the importance of both the heart and the brain in the proper functioning of a human but saw these as two distinct systems governed separately. Therefore, there are two souls in combat, the brain representing the logical soul and driving logical being, the heart representing spirited actions of movement and impulse constantly at odds with each other and supplied by different supporting systems.

Galen states the "liver is the archai" or the source of the veins and blood of the body and is therefore important in regards to the appetitive soul, but does little to elaborate further on the reason for its connection on why this makes it appetitive. He continues to theorize that the "spleen purifies the liver". Galen addresses that the proof for the liver is not as obvious as it was in the case of the heart and the brain.

Galen also made a focus on the view on nature. He agreed with ancient doctrine of the four elements which includes the earth, water, wind and the fire to embody the cold, hot dry and wet irreducible qualities. This made a correspondence to the essential body humors which includes the blood, the black bile the phlegm and the yellow bile. The humor had to get their origin from the foods’ elements. The Physiology of Galen started with the nutrition. Food was transformed in the blood and the blood was later on Trans mutated into the tissues’ flesh, the human body however constituted of more of hungry organs. It had both the vitality and the warmth. It was in a position to move voluntarily. It also had thoughts. Therefore, the blood was avital spirit overlaid on the natural spirits or the nutritive. The natural spirit originated from the food and the drink, the origin of the vital spirit was from the atmospheric air . The veins carried the natural spirits while the arteries carried the vital spirits. The heart was centrally located. The heart organ played a role in mediating the exchange of the blood which was in the vein and the air in the arteries. The body was also provided with innate heat by the heart. The heart was not a pump. It was a factory and a smelter’s furnace. The rest of the parts of the body and their actions resulted from the 4 elements combination, the humors and the qualities. Galen made a proposal of natural faculties’ theory in which every part of the body had the ability to retain, attract its nutritive humors as well as expelling the excrements. Therefore, the flow of materials within the body parts seemed to be following a gradient of both the attractive and the expulsive powers.

He also made reaffirmation about the heart as a source of innate heat of the body "The heart is, as it were, the hearthstone and source of the innate heat by which the animal is governed." He also made a careful observation of the physical properties which were unusual. He described the heart to be a very hard flesh which could not be easily injured. The hardness, the tension and also the general strength together with the resistance to injury contributed to a unique property of the heart. He also made an argument about the expansion and the contraction of the heart which made a heart an intelligent organ for playing such a role. The complexity of the fibers of the heart also was prepared to carry out several functions: getting to enlarge when it was to attract what was useful, getting to clasp the contents in which it had attracted and also getting to contact when it was due time to expel the residue. Galen contradicted Aristotle, who stated that the heart was a point origin of the nerves. He further made an argument that the heart was just a secondary organ which was next to the liver organ in its operation because it was not site responsible in the production of the humors. His ideas predominated until the mid of seventeenth

== Plotinus ==
The Egyptian philosopher and father of Neo-Platonism, Plotinus’s idea of the human soul would form the foundation for the Christian view of the human soul. Like Plato, Plotinus believed that the soul resulted from an immortal being that would return to its divine source upon death. Plotinus believed in two parts of the soul, a higher level rational part and the lower level portion located in the entire body.

Plotinus saw the soul as a tool of universal structure and one of two parts of the human form: body and soul. He saw the soul as what was responsible for life and for there to be existence after death, the soul could not be in the body. However, the body was necessary for the soul to exist. Therefore, there was a duality to the roles of the soul among Plotinus' philosophy. The soul played an important role in merging with the One, the "ultimate object of desire".

Plotinus created three stages to reaching the goal of "attaining union with the One".

=== Stage 1: Return to one's true self as soul ===
This stage involves gaining control of your own body through Plato's civic virtues and detachment from material goods. Here you recognize yourself as soul, "a divine reality independent of body and prior to it".

=== Stage 2: Attaining the life of divine intellect ===
This second stage involves embracing the higher processes of the soul and abandoning the current way of thinking. Since the soul is a bridge between the human form and reaching the One, the thinking processes of the soul and its divinity will lift you closer to the One.

=== Stage 3: Union with the One ===
The final step is an abandonment of all things one has learned before. Since the One is above all knowledge, language, and reasoning; it must be a personal journey to unite.

As Plotinus himself put it:

Therefore ‘it cannot be said’ or ‘written’, he says [Plato, Letter 7, 341c], but we speak and write, sending on to it and wakening from words [or explanations] towards contemplation, as if showing the way to him who wishes to see something. For teaching extends to the road and the passage, but the vision is the work of him who has decided to see.

== Thomas Aquinas ==
Thomas Aquinas sought a Christian view of the soul using the ideas of Aristotle. In Aquinas’s view, the soul was incorporeal and immortal, and came about as a direct result of divine intervention from God, which typically came about during the second trimester of pregnancy. At this point, the fetus would have the ability to perceive and move, the result of being given a soul. As such, being incorporeal, though "infused" in an unknown manner to the body, and being the "form" of the body in a platonic sense, the soul has no location, and therefore cannot be "located in" the body as one locates an organ. This is the typical understanding of the soul found in the Catholic Church today.

== Leonardo da Vinci ==
Leonardo da Vinci used his experience in the field of anatomy to hypothesize that the soul was located in the optic chiasm, near the 3rd ventricle of the brain. His views were supported by observations of change in perception following disturbances to that particular area of the brain.

Da Vinci's search for the soul fell into three phases: Early Concepts, Personal Quest, and Synthesis.

=== Phase 1: Early Concepts ===
From his 1487 experiment of pithing frogs, Da Vinci honed in on the medulla as the location of the soul:

the frog instantly dies when its spinal medulla is perforated. And previously it lived without heart or any interior organs, or intestines or skin. Here therefore, it appears, lies the foundation of movement and life.

=== Phase 2: Personal Quest ===
In this second phase, Da Vinci began examining the nervous system and how they connected with the skull. This phase is when he stated that the soul was located slightly above the optic chiasm, in the anterior portion of the 3rd ventricle.

This phase also establishes the role of the soul in the body according to Da Vinci. Da Vinci saw the soul as ruling over all of the senses, he states, "The Soul appears to reside in the seat of judgement, and the judicial part appears to be in that place where all the senses come together, which is called the 'senso comune'."

=== Phase 3: Synthesis ===
This final stage involved further study into the anatomy of the brain. Da Vinci used wax to fill the ventricles of an ox brain in order to have a physical model of the location of the "senso comune" as well as two other landmarks, the imprensiva and memoria.

== René Descartes ==
Descartes accepted Plotinus’s perspective on the dual nature of the soul. According to Descartes, the soul conferred the ability to think; this differentiated humans from animals, who had no ability to think or even feel. However, Descartes believed that the physical body and the mind must be physically connected at some point. Descartes’ reasoning came from his observation that every structure of the brain is paired except for the pineal gland. He felt that the pineal gland must be the meeting point of the physical body and the mind, and therefore, the pineal gland must be the location of the soul.

== Traditional Chinese philosophy ==
In wuxing, the five Shen are housed in the five yin organs (also known as zàng (脏)) as follows:

- The heart houses or stores the shen (神), 'breath'
- The lung houses or stores the po (魄), 'yin soul which remains with the corpse'
- The liver houses or stores the hun (魂), 'yang soul which leaves the body after death'
- The spleen houses or stores the yi (意), 'intellect'
- The kidneys house or store the zhi (志), 'will'

== See also ==
- Soul dualism
- Body swap
- History of the pineal gland
