= Twin souls =

Twin souls may refer to:

- Soul dualism, the range of beliefs that a person has two or more kinds of souls
- Soulmate, a person with whom one has a feeling of deep or natural affinity.
