= Soul dualism =

Range of beliefs that a person has two or more kinds of souls

Soul dualism, also called dualistic pluralism or multiple souls, is a range of beliefs that a person has two or more kinds of souls. In many cases, one of the souls is associated with body functions ("body soul") and the other one can leave the body ("free soul" or "wandering soul"). Sometimes the plethora of soul types can be even more complex. Sometimes, a shaman's "free soul" may be held to be able to undertake a spirit journey.

== Examples ==
=== Austronesia ===
The belief in soul dualism found throughout most Austronesian shamanistic traditions. The reconstructed Proto-Austronesian word for the "body soul" is *nawa ("breath", "life", or "vital spirit"). It is located somewhere in the abdominal cavity, often in the liver (Proto-Austronesian *qaCay), or the heart. The "free soul" is located in the head. Its names are usually derived from Proto-Austronesian *qaNiCu ("ghost", "spirit [of the dead]"), which also apply to other non-human nature spirits. The "free soul" is also referred to in names that literally mean "twin" or "double", from Proto-Austronesian *duSa ("two"). A virtuous person is said to be one whose souls are in harmony with each other, while an evil person is one whose souls are in conflict.

The "free soul" is said to leave the body and journey to the spirit world during trance-like states, sleep, delirium, death, and insanity. The duality is also seen in the healing traditions of Austronesian shamans, where illnesses are regarded as a "soul loss" and thus to heal the sick, one must "return" the "free soul" (which may have been stolen by an evil spirit or got lost in the spirit world) into the body. If the "free soul" can not be returned, the afflicted person dies or goes permanently insane.

In some ethnic groups, there can also be more than two souls. Among the Tagbanwa, a person is said to have six souls - the "free soul" (which is regarded as the "true" soul) and five secondary souls with various functions.

=== China ===
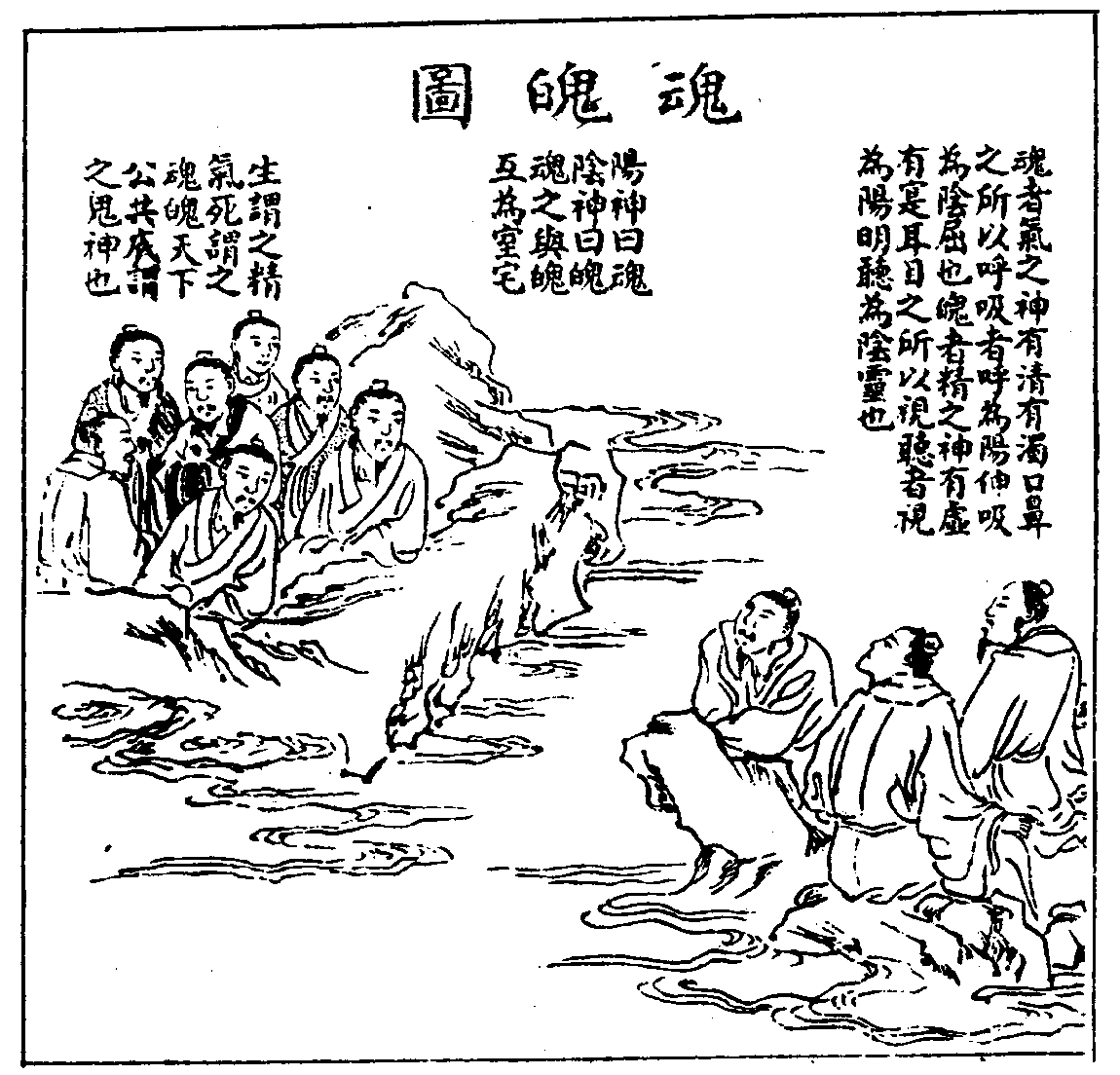
The Hun and Po Souls 魂魄圖, 1615 Xingming guizhi

Traditional Chinese culture differentiates two hun and po spirits or souls, which correlate with yang and yin respectively. Within this soul dualism, every human has both an ethereal hun 魂 "spiritual soul; spirit; mood" that leaves the body after death and a substantive po 魄 "physical soul; spirit; vigor" that remains with the corpse. Chinese traditions differ over the number of hun and po souls in a person, for example, Taoism has the sanhunqipo 三魂七魄 "three hun and seven po".

=== Inuit ===
Several Inuit groups believe that a person has more than one type of soul. One is associated with respiration, the other can accompany the body as a shadow. Soul concepts of different Inuit groups are diverse. In some cases, it is connected to shamanistic beliefs among the various Inuit groups. Also Caribou Inuit groups believed in several types of souls.

=== Kongo ===
In traditional Bakongo religion, every Kongo person has a "dual soul-mind," called mwèla-ngindu that allows them to exist in the physical world (Nseke) and the spiritual world of the ancestors (Mpémba). The rotation of the sun marks the different seasons of a Kongo person's life as they transition between the four moments of life: conception (musoni), birth (kala), maturity (tukula), and death (luvemba). The right side of the body is also believed to be male, while the left side is believed to be female, creating an additional layer to the dual identity of Kongo people.

=== Uralic peoples ===
The concept of more kinds of souls can be found also in the mythologies of several Uralic peoples. See notion of shadow-soul (being able to depart freely the body), e.g. íz in Hungarian folk beliefs. The concept of a dualistic shadow-soul called itse, related to the Hungarian conception, is also part of Finnish and other Finnic mythologies. The Estonian soul concept has been approached by several authors, some of them using rather complex frameworks.

== See also ==
- Ancient Egyptian conception of the soul, divided into five or more parts
- Ti bon ange and the gros bon ange in Haitian Vodou; Soul dualism in Haitian Vodou.
- Ancient Greek concept of Psyche (ψυχή, psykhē) and Pneuma (πνεῦμα, pneuma).
  - Eidolon
  - Shade (mythology)
- Mitama (Japanese)
- Hun and po (Chinese)
- Body swap
- Dualism in cosmology
- History of the location of the soul
- Mind–body dualism
- Soulcatcher
- Soul loss
- Tripartite (theology)

== Sources ==
- Dienes, István (1975). "A honfoglaló magyarok és ősi hiedelmeik". In Hajdú, Péter (ed.). Uráli népek / Nyelvrokonaink kultúrája és hagyományai [book title means “Uralic peoples / Culture and traditions of our linguistic relatives”; the chapter means “The Hungarians at the time of entering the Carpathian Basin, and their ancient beliefs”] (in Hungarian). Budapest: Corvina Kiadó. pp. 77–108. ISBN 963-13-0900-2.
- Diószegi, Vilmos (1962). Samanizmus. Élet és Tudomány Kiskönyvtár. Budapest: Gondolat.
- Fodor, István (2005). "Az ősi magyar vallásról". In Molnár, Ádám (ed.). Csodaszarvas. Őstörténet, vallás és néphagyomány. Vol. I [The chapter title means: “About the ancient Hungarian religion”; the book title means: “Miracle deer. Ancient history, religion and folklore tradition”] (in Hungarian). Budapest: Molnár Kiadó. pp. 11–34. ISBN 963-218-200-6.
- Gabus, Jean (1970). A karibu eszkimók (in Hungarian). Budapest: Gondolat Kiadó. Translation of the original: Gabus, Jean (1944). Vie et coutumes des Esquimaux Caribous. Libraire Payot Lausanne. It describes the life of Caribou Eskimo and Padlermiut groups.
- Hoppál, Mihály (1975). "Az uráli népek hiedelemvilága és a samanizmus". In Hajdú, Péter (ed.). Uráli népek. Nyelvrokonaink kultúrája és hagyományai [The book title means: “Uralic peoples / Culture and traditions of our linguistic relatives”; the chapter title means “The belief system of Uralic peoples and the shamanism”] (in Hungarian). Budapest: Corvina Kiadó. pp. 211–233. ISBN 963-13-0900-2.
- Hoppál, Mihály (1994). Sámánok. Lelkek és jelképek [“Shamans / Souls and symbols”]. Budapest: Helikon Kiadó. ISBN 963-208-298-2.
- Kleivan, Inge; Sonne, B. (1985). "Arctic peoples". Eskimos. Greenland and Canada. Institute of Religious Iconography. Iconography of religions. Leiden, The Netherland): State University Groningen, via E.J. Brill. section VIII, fascicle 2. ISBN 90-04-07160-1.
- Merkur, Daniel (1985). Becoming Half Hidden / Shamanism and Initiation among the Inuit. Acta Universitatis Stockholmiensis / Stockholm Studies in Comparative Religion. Stockholm: Almqvist & Wiksell. ISBN 91-22-00752-0.
- Johansen, Ulla (2005). "Sámánfilozófia: változó lélekképzetek Tuvában". In Molnár, Ádám (ed.). Csodaszarvas. Őstörténet, vallás és néphagyomány [The chapter title means: “Shamanic philosophy: soul concepts in Tuva, changing in time”; the book title means: “Miracle deer. Ancient history, religion and folklore tradition”] (in Hungarian). Vol. I. Budapest: Molnár Kiadó. pp. 135–156. ISBN 963-218-200-6.
- Oosten, Jarich G. (1997). "Cosmological Cycles and the Constituents of the Person". In S. A. Mousalimas (ed.). Arctic Ecology and Identity. International Society for Trans-Oceanic Research. ISTOR Books 8. Budapest, HU; Los Angeles, CA: Akadémiai Kiadó. pp. 85–101. ISBN 963-05-6629-X.
