= BeAnotherLab =

Virtual reality company

BeAnotherLab is an international anti-disciplinary collective dedicated to investigate the relationship between identity and empathy, attempting to communicate, understand and expand subjective experience through embodiment and telepresent experiences. The collective was born in Barcelona.

== The machine to be another ==
The "machine" is an open source system developed by BeAnotherLab which uses a head-mounted display to transmit video from one person's perspective to another. The specifications for the system, including software, are freely available. The most recent iteration of the project uses the Oculus Rift, a virtual reality headset. In the first project to use the system, one person plays the role of "user" and the other "performer". They each occupy separate but identical rooms, and as the user explores the room the performer follows their movements in real time. Because the user receives video from the performer's perspective, the user feels as though they are inhabiting the body of the performer. As they interact with objects in the room, the performer transmits personal thoughts to the user through headphones to create a furthered sense of intimacy. A member of BeAnotherLab, Phillip Betrand, said of the experiment,

"We believe this allows for a deeper experience for a user, knowing that their point of view is that of an actual human being, and not a virtual avatar. In the last year, we’ve observed that subjects tend to demonstrate empathetic feelings towards the performers they didn't have before. They say that the experience has raised their awareness about the performers' social conditions, that they were able to go 'deep into this other person's life.'"

Daanish Masood, a member of BeAnotherLab and advisor at the United Nations Alliance of Civilizations, has since used the project to explore conflict resolution applications for tensions across cultural barriers.

== Gender swap ==
Using a modified version of The Machine To Be Another system, Gender Swap allows a user to feel as though they are inhabiting the body of someone with a different gender from their own. The piece focuses on the interaction between the sense of touch and vision. Two users of different genders wear Oculus Rift headsets which transmit the view from the each other's perspective. The users synchronize their movements and run their hands along their bodies. By associating the visuals from each other's point of view with the sensation of being touched, the users are supposed to have the sensation of inhabiting each other's bodies. In April 2014, the project won a Learning, Sciences and Humanities award from Laval Virtual, an annual event focusing on virtual reality projects. It was also awarded an honorary mention at Ars Electronica. Because of the project's success, BeAnotherLab started a research collaboration with the Massachusetts Institute of Technology (MIT) in January 2015. In this collaboration they hope to further upgrade the hardware and software which comprise the Machine To Be Another, as well as to explore new social applications for the system.

== See also ==
- Virtual reality
- Oculus Rift
- Body swap
