= Mingqi =

Chinese burial goods

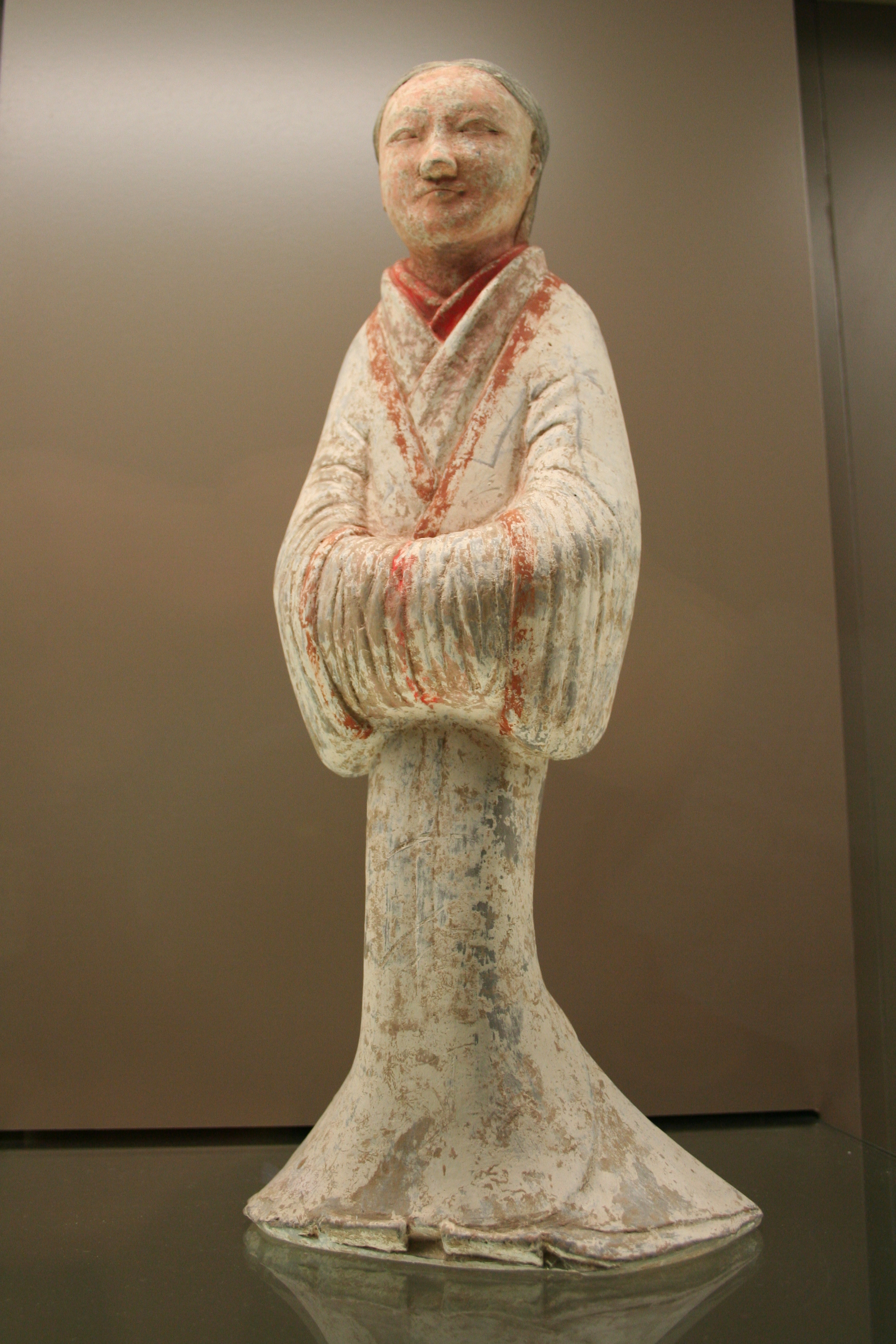
Terra cotta figure from Shaanxi, Western Han Period (206 BC – 9 AD)

Mingqi (Chinese: 冥器 or 明器, p míngqì), sometimes referred to as "spirit objects" or "vessels for ghosts", are Chinese burial goods. They included daily utensils, musical instruments, weapons, armor, and intimate objects such as the deceased's cap, can and bamboo mat. Mingqi also could include figurines, spiritual representations rather than real people, of soldiers, servants, musicians, polo riders, houses, unicorns and horses. Extensive use of mingqi during certain periods may either have been an attempt to preserve the image of ritual propriety by cutting costs, or it may have a new idea separating the realm of the dead from that of the living.

== Purpose ==
Mingqi served to provide the deceased with necessities and comforts in the afterlife. The deceased person's po was said to remain in the realm of the tomb while the hun ascended to heaven. To appease and make worthwhile the deceased's po, mingqi claimed relevant and liked by the deceased were placed in his tomb. Upon placing mingqi in the tomb, humans, according to the Confucian ideal, were harmonizing the cosmos by striking a balance for the comfort of the deceased who is also comforted in heaven.

In various dynasties after the Qin dynasty, some important Confucianists also believed in xian, the Taoist concept of immortal spiritual beings, and the land in which they lived. Mingqi was thought by these Confucianists to be able to harness the hun and po to give the status of an immortal unto the deceased.

The more mingqi one held to have the wealthier and strong social status one may have.

== See also ==
- Joss offerings, also referred to as mingqi
- Hell money
- hun and po, components of the spirit
  in ancient Chinese religion
- Miniature art
