= Lingshan Temple (Lishui) =

Buddhist temple in Lishui, Zhejiang, China

- 灵山寺
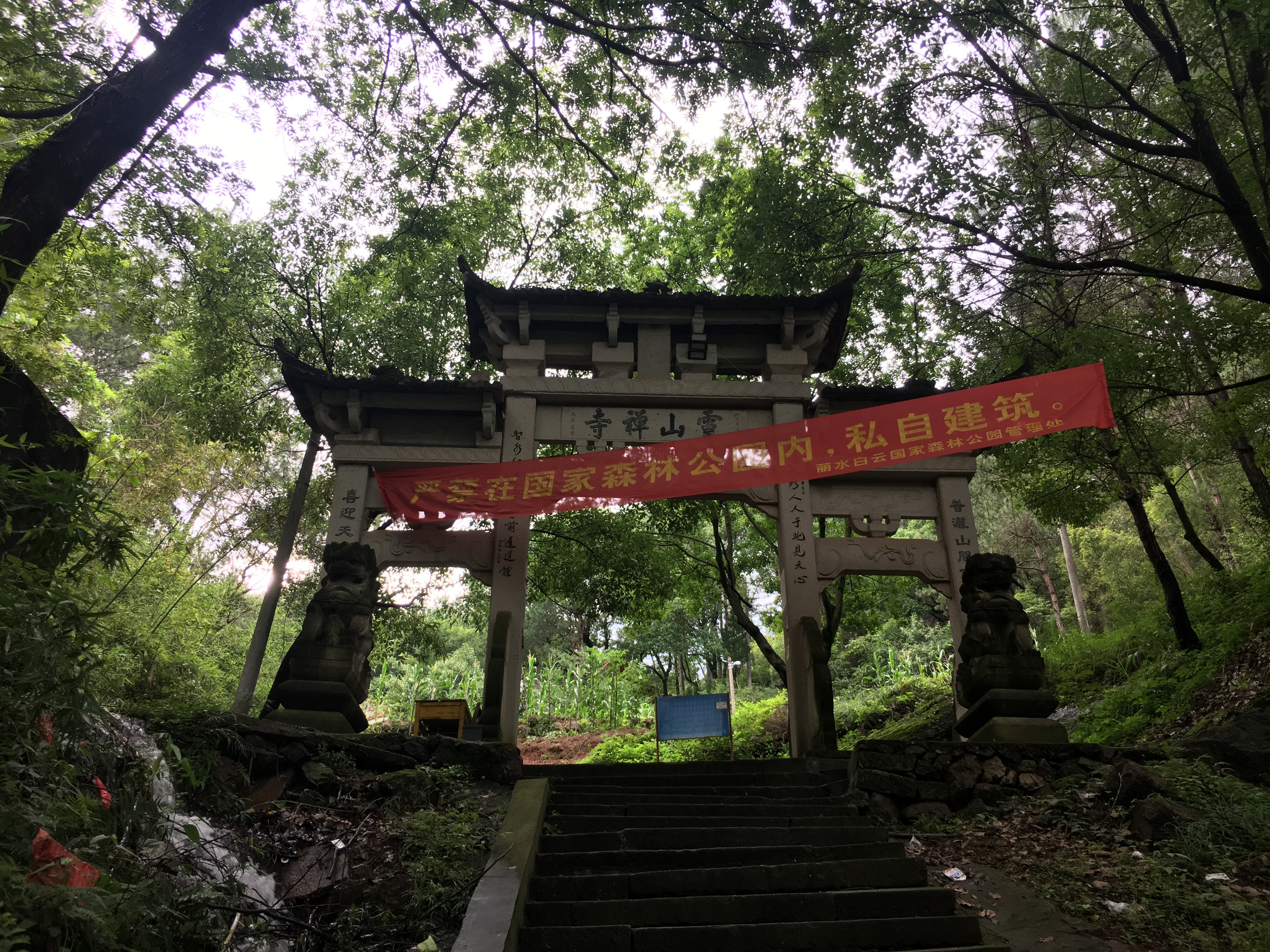
- A paifang at Lingshan Temple.

- Location within Zhejiang

Religion
- Affiliation: Buddhism
- Deity: Chan Buddhism

Location
- Location: Lishui, Zhejiang
- Country: China
- Interactive map of Lingshan Temple
- Coordinates: 28°29′08″N 119°58′35″E

Architecture
- Style: Chinese architecture
- Established: 320

Lingshan Temple (simplified Chinese: 灵山寺; traditional Chinese: 靈山寺; pinyin: Língshān Sì) is a Buddhist temple located in Lishui, Zhejiang, China.

== History ==
The original temple dates back to 320 during the Eastern Jin dynasty (266–420). But it was demolished in a fire in 574 during the Northern Zhou dynasty (557–581).

In 633, in the reign of Emperor Taizong of Tang in the Tang dynasty (618–907), local government reconstructed a temple on the original site named "Lingjiu Temple" (灵鹫寺).

In 961, at the dawn of Song dynasty (960–1279), monk Zhusheng (祝生) renovated the temple and erected the Hall of Guanyin.

== Architecture ==
The grand temple complex include the following halls: Shanmen, Mahavira Hall, Hall of Four Heavenly Kings, Hall of Guanyin, Bell tower, Drum tower, Hall of Guru, Hall of Arhat, Dharma Hall, Dining Room, etc.

== Gallery ==
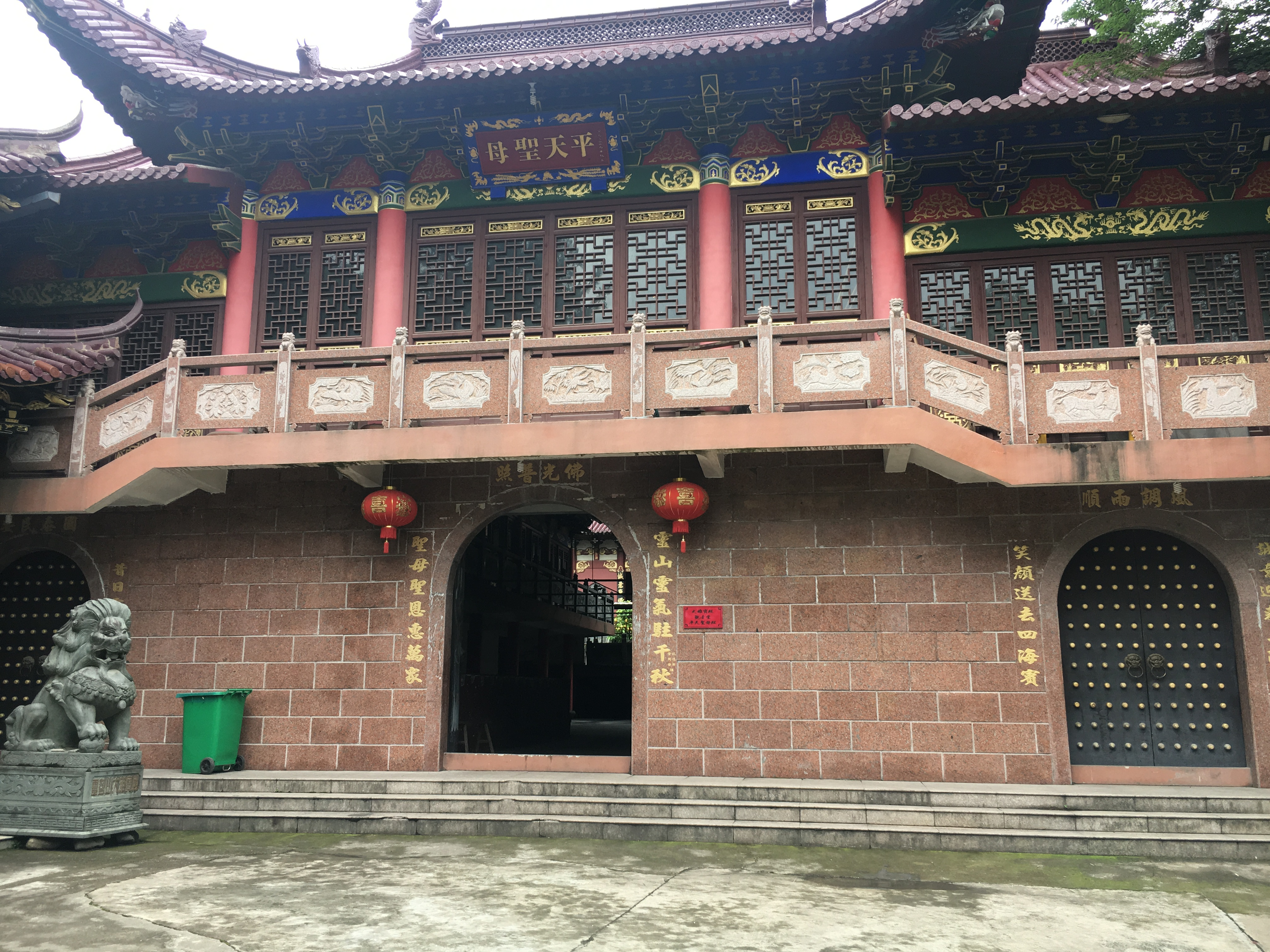
The Hall of Goddess at Lingshan Temple.

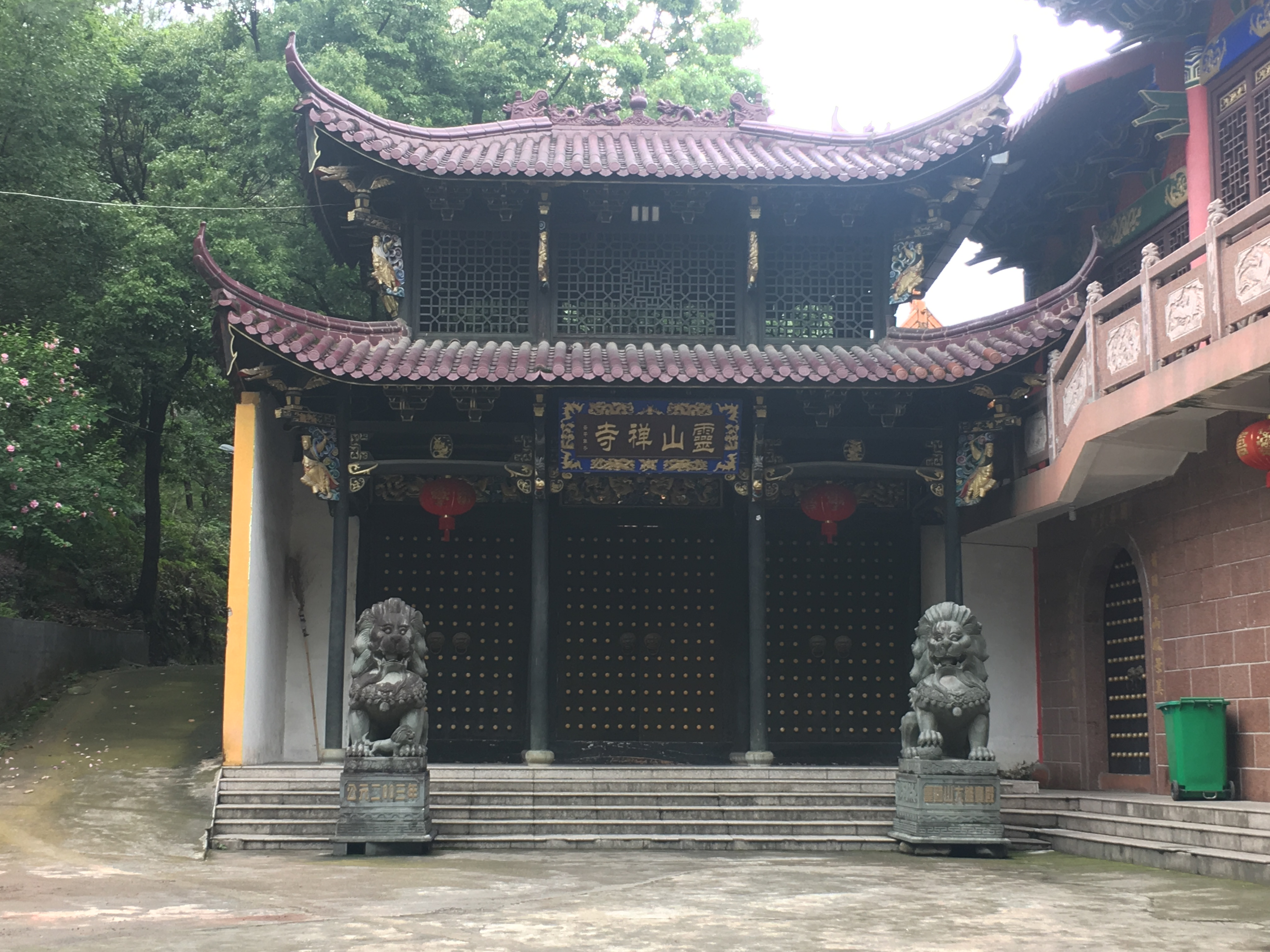
A hall of Lingshan Temple.

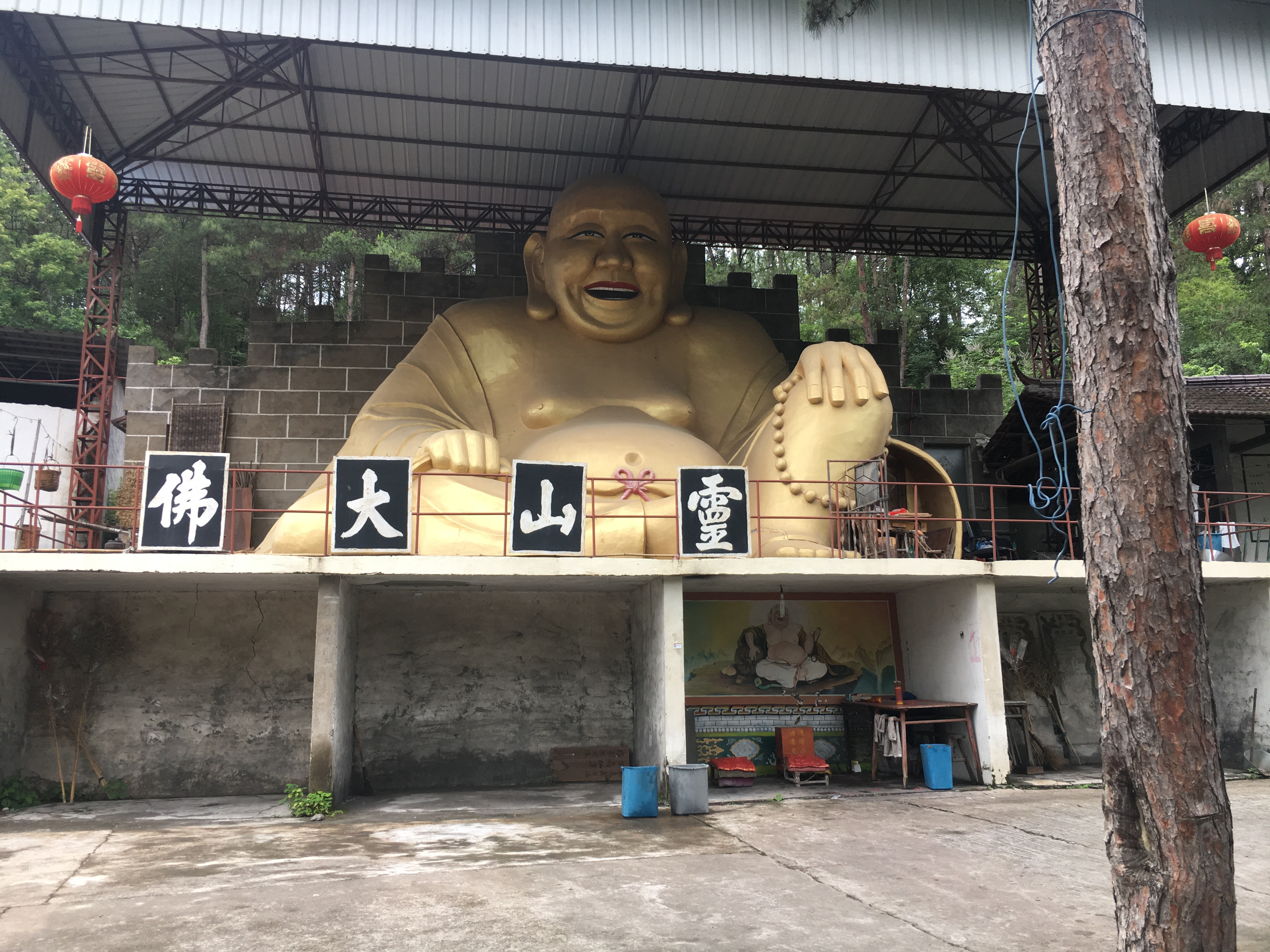
Sitting statue of Maitreya at Lingshan Temple.
