= Body swap =

Storytelling device

A body swap (also named mind swap, soul swap or brain swap) is a storytelling device seen in a variety of science fiction and supernatural fiction, in which two people (or beings) exchange minds and end up in each other's bodies. The Encyclopedia of Science Fiction calls the trope identity exchange, a version of "identity transfer".

== Description ==
There are different types of body swapping. For non-technology swapping, switches can be caused by magic items such as amulets, heartfelt wishes, or just strange quirks of the universe. The switches typically reverse after the subjects have expanded their world views, gained a new appreciation for each other's troubles by literally "walking in another's shoes" and/or caused sufficient amounts of farce. Examples include the books Vice Versa (1882) and Freaky Friday (1972), as well as the film versions of both.

Switches accomplished by technology, exempting gadgets advanced sufficiently to appear as magic, are the fare of mad scientists. Body-swapping devices are usually characterized by a highly experimental status, straps, helmets with many complicated cables that run to a central system and a tendency to direly malfunction before their effects can be reversed. This 'electrode helmet' style appears to originate with The Man Who Changed His Mind (1936). Those without such means may resort to brain transplants. Such experiments can have overtones of horror or erotism.

Body swap is one of the mechanisms of accidental travel in fiction.

== See also ==
- BeAnotherLab
- Body swap appearances in media
- Brain transplant
- Head transplant
- Mind uploading in fiction
- Soul dualism
- Soul loss
- Reincarnation
