= Soul loss =

Shamanism term

In shamanism, the term loss of soul refers to the loss of the human part of the life force, the soul.

== Causes of soul loss in shamanism ==
The prevailing concept in traditional shamanism is "any illness is a consequence of a lost or stolen soul. The Khanty and Mansi had the idea that a person had five souls.

The main explanation of the mechanism of soul loss is that in order to preserve oneself in an intolerable situation, part of the soul leaves, as continuing to be in these conditions is so uncomfortable that it can lead to complete disintegration.

In some cultures saying God bless you after sneezing is believed to help prevent soul loss.

In Bali, motorcycle accidents are believed to cause soul loss, resulting in a revival of the belief.

== Symptoms of soul loss in shamanism ==
Sandra Ingerman, in her book Return of the Soul, identifies the following symptoms of soul loss:

- Dissociation
- Chronic illnesses
- Depression
- Multiple personality syndrome
- Chemical dependency
- Post-traumatic stress disorder
- Difficulty making decisions
- Feeling numb
- Apathy
- Chronic bad luck
- Memory lapses

== Soul retrieval by a shaman ==
Some people believe that the soul can be returned with the help of shaman, that he goes to his helper spirits or teachers with a request to help in the return of the soul, negotiates with the part of the soul found, asks about the reasons for its departure, finds out the conditions under which the soul will be willing to return, with the claim that the shaman shifts the vast majority of the work of returning the soul to other entities. In preparation for the return of the soul, the shaman may preliminarily produce the return of an animal power.
