= Women in agriculture in India =

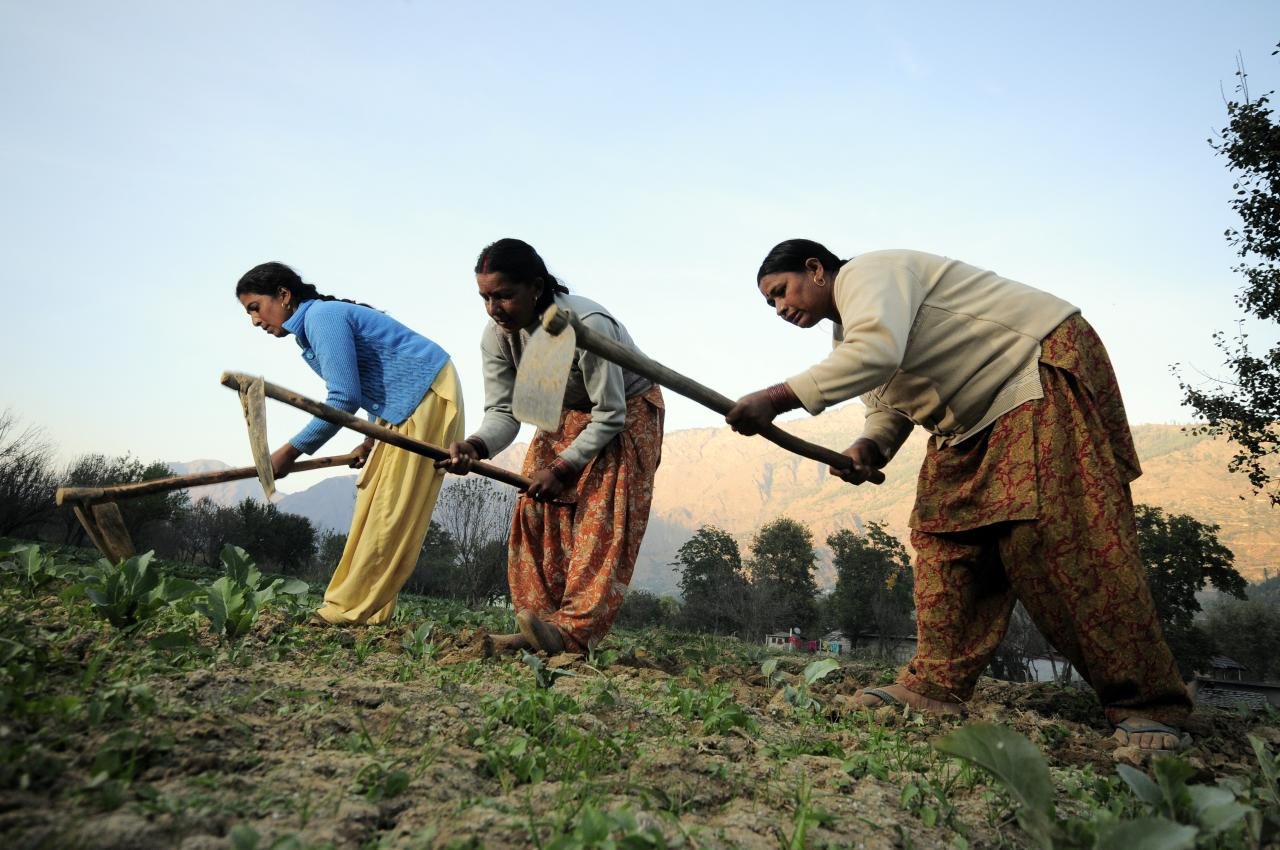
Pic by Neil Palmer (CIAT). Women farmers at work in their vegetable plots near Kullu town, Himachal Pradesh, India. Previously, the area was a major producer of high-value apples, but rising temperatures in the last few decades have forced almost all apple producers there to abandon their crop. For these farmers, switching to vegetable production has resulted in a major boost in incomes and livelihoods, illustrating that climate change adaptation can be effective and highly profitable.

India has an economy bound to historical agricultural tradition. In the North, the Indus valley and Brahmaputra region are critical agricultural areas with water supplied by the Ganges and monsoon season. Agriculture is a way of life for the majority of India's population; based on 2011 World Bank data, only 17.5% of India's gross domestic product (GDP) is accounted for by agricultural production. Women are an important but often overlooked population in India's agricultural production—they represent the majority of the agricultural labor force. Women's participation in the agrarian labor force plays out in various ways, impacting their economic independence, their decision-making abilities, their agency and access to education and health services. Many women in farming communities suffer poverty and marginalization, and issues of gender inequality.

== Indian agriculture ==
Based on 2012 data, India is home to the fourth-largest agricultural sector in the world. India has an estimated 180 million hectares of farmland with 140 million of which are planted and continuously cultivated. Yet India's agricultural profile is shadowed by the controversial impacts of Green Revolution policies that were adopted in the 1960s and 70s with pressure from the United States Agency for International Development and the World Bank.

The Green Revolution brought a modern approach to agriculture by incorporating irrigation systems, genetically modified seed variations, insecticide and pesticide usage, and numerous land reforms. It had an explosive impact, providing unprecedented agricultural productivity in India and turned the country from a food importer to an exporter. Yet the Green Revolution also caused agricultural prices to drop, which damaged India's small farmers. Over the years, Green Revolution technology has caused decreases in agricultural yields. This problem was particularly grave for smallholder farmers, because intensification of synthetic inputs and more advanced agricultural technology is required from year to year in order to maintain the same high levels of production on the same plot of land. Small holder farmers cultivate less than 2 hectares of lands; the majority of all Indian farmers are smallholders and produce the majority of India’s produce. Smallholder farmers face the largest negative impact from green revolution technology–the synthetic inputs have adversely impacted their soil, decreasing yields. Due to the smaller scales of their operations, they are unable to afford more synthetic inputs to compensate for poor soil quality caused by the initial introduction of off-farm inputs. This leads to a “treadmill of technology dependence,” which continues to speed up as soil health declines. In addition to the financial issue, there are also the environmental impacts of the Green revolution which all farmers, big and small, must contend with. Intensification of synthetic fertilizer and pesticide inputs leads to a loss in biodiversity which continues to degrade the environmental quality of cultivated land. Groundwater depletion, soil health decline, a loss of crop genetic diversity all make the created environment continually more inhospitable to introduced crop varieties that have not had the advantage of years of evolution to make them best suited to the changing conditions.

India's agricultural sector today still faces issues of efficiency due to lack of mechanization with poorer conditions of farmers, as well as small farm sizes. In India, traditional agriculture is still dominant as many farmers depend on livestock in crop production, for manure as fertilizers, and the use of animal-powered ploughs. According to 2011 statistics, the average farm in India is about 1.5 acres, minuscule when compared the average of 50 hectares in France and or 178 hectares in United States and 273 hectares in Canada.

The small farmer tradition of India can be drawn back to the first farm reforms of independent India. Known as the Laws of Divided Inheritance, the reforms were meant to limit the conglomeration of land, by mandating redistribution as land was divided among male inheritors from the prior generation. The perpetuation of these laws not only limits farm size but also bars women from ownership or inheritance. Furthermore, as small farmers face increasing competition with larger farm operations an increasing number of men migrate to city centers for higher wages and employment. Women are in turn left to support the family structure and support small farm lifestyle. In 2011, the agricultural sector workforce in the subcontinent was 75% women.

=== Feminization of Indian agriculture ===
With the advent of The Green Revolution, and then liberalization, male labor was increasingly drawn towards urban centers, leading to an increased number of women involved in agricultural labor.

== A statistical profile ==
In rural India, the percentage of women who depend on agriculture for their livelihood is as high as 84%. Women make up about 33% of cultivators and about 47% percent of agricultural labourers. These statistics do not account for work in livestock, fisheries and various other ancillary forms of food production in the country. In 2009, 94% of the female agricultural labour force in crop cultivation were in cereal production, while 1.4% worked in vegetable production, and 3.72% were engaged in fruits, nuts, beverages, and spice crops.

Women's participation rate in the agricultural sectors is about 47% in tea plantations, 46.84% in cotton cultivation, 45.43% growing oil seeds and 39.13% in vegetable production. While these crops require labor-intensive work, the work is considered quite unskilled. Women also heavily participate in ancillary agricultural activities. According to the Food and Agriculture Organization, Indian women represented a share of 21% and 24% of all fishers and fish farmers, respectively.

Despite their dominance of the labor force women in India still face extreme disadvantage in terms of pay, land rights, and representation in local farmers organizations. Furthermore, their lack of empowerment often results in negative externalities such as lower educational attainment for their children and poor familial health.

== Gendered division of agrarian labor ==
In India, the typical work of the female agricultural laborer or cultivator is limited to less skilled jobs, such as sowing, transplanting, weeding and harvesting, that often fit well within the framework of domestic life and child-rearing. In cotton seed production, they are engaged in pollination activity which requires patience and a little bit of precision. Many women also participate in agricultural work as unpaid subsistence labor. According to United Nations Human Development Report only 32.8% of Indian women formally participate in the labor force, a rate that has remained steady since 2009 statistics. By comparison, men constitute 81.1%.

=== Literacy among women in farming communities ===
An estimated 52–75% of Indian women engaged in agriculture are illiterate, an education barrier that prevents women from participating in more skilled labor sectors. Women generally face low access to agricultural information that is generated outside their own families. This is primarily due to lower rates of literacy and a lack of mobility–but women will readily disperse information to women of other households, even other villages. Some district governments in Karnataka are looking into establishing self-help groups for women to create larger social networks through which women may disseminate information about agricultural practices, circumventing the low literacy rates. In all activities, there is an average gender wage disparity, with women earning only 70 percent of men's wage. Additionally, many women participate in agricultural work as unpaid subsistence labor. The lack of employment mobility and education render the majority of women in India vulnerable, as dependents on the growth and stability of the agricultural market.

=== Arranged marriages and caste ===
In rural India, women's role in the household is greatly defined by social structure and familial ties. Arranged marriages specific to each caste system, determine their economic worth, and are expected early on in a woman's life. Depending on caste and economic class a woman's role can be determined as one of more in the public eye or predominantly of seclusion; a life in which women are expected to care for children and maintain the household. The typical rural Indian household is a patriarchal and partilocal one, in which a husband, or in his stead the oldest son will make the decisions for a family.

== Time allocation ==
In addition to rigorous agricultural work that is undervalued and underpaid, women are also responsible for the well-being of the household. They care for their children, provide nutrition or usually take part in subsistence agriculture, and do chores around the house. Based on time allocation studies, which pinpoint exactly how a woman's hours are spent throughout the week, Indian women spend about 25 hours in a week doing household chores and five hours in caring and community work.

Besides the 30 hours of unpaid work, women spend the same amount of time as men carrying out agricultural work. Daughters typically supplement or substitute for mother's unpaid work around the household. Considered female tasks, the opportunity cost of girls' time for school is higher than that of sons. Girls do significantly more housework than boys, which compromises their schooling.

While some studies in Orissa suggest that organic farming could increase the amount of labor and time spent on agricultural duties for women, more research needs to be done to expand conclusions across India.

== Access to land and resources ==
Critical resources such as land are also unevenly distributed by gender. Women seldom enjoy property ownership rights directly in their names. They have little control over decisions made in reference to land. Even with land in their names, they may not have actual decision-making power in terms of cropping patterns, sale, mortgage and the purchase of land. In India, only 14.9% of households are female headed. Access to credit is difficult, since women lack many of the prerequisites for lending such as assets or ownership of property. Without access to capital or household decision making abilities women lack the resources that are necessary for their labor stability and stability of their households.

Furthermore, without access to support from the National Bank for Agriculture and Rural Development, banks, and cooperative societies, women are excluded from information that would make their production more competitive in the agricultural markets. The traditional systematic denial of women as key producers in India's agriculture causes them to often be overlooked in the research and study, thus further entrenching the exclusion of women in roles of agency. According to Amartya Sen, and Martha Nussbaum’s Capability Approach, equality in access is critical step to economic empowerment to create gender equality. In conjunction, the early access to education and health services is critical to the capabilities and self-actualization of girls. The attainment of these necessary life structures is determined by cultural norms as well as the economic standing of the family.

Land ownership opportunities also have a critical impact on human development with freedom from violence. According to a 2005 study of marital violence and property ownership, 49% of propertyless women experience physical violence and 84% experienced psychological abuse. Ownership rights saw a drastic decrease in violence. Among women who owned both land and house there was only 7% physical violence and 16% psychological abuse.

== Women farmers and the environment ==
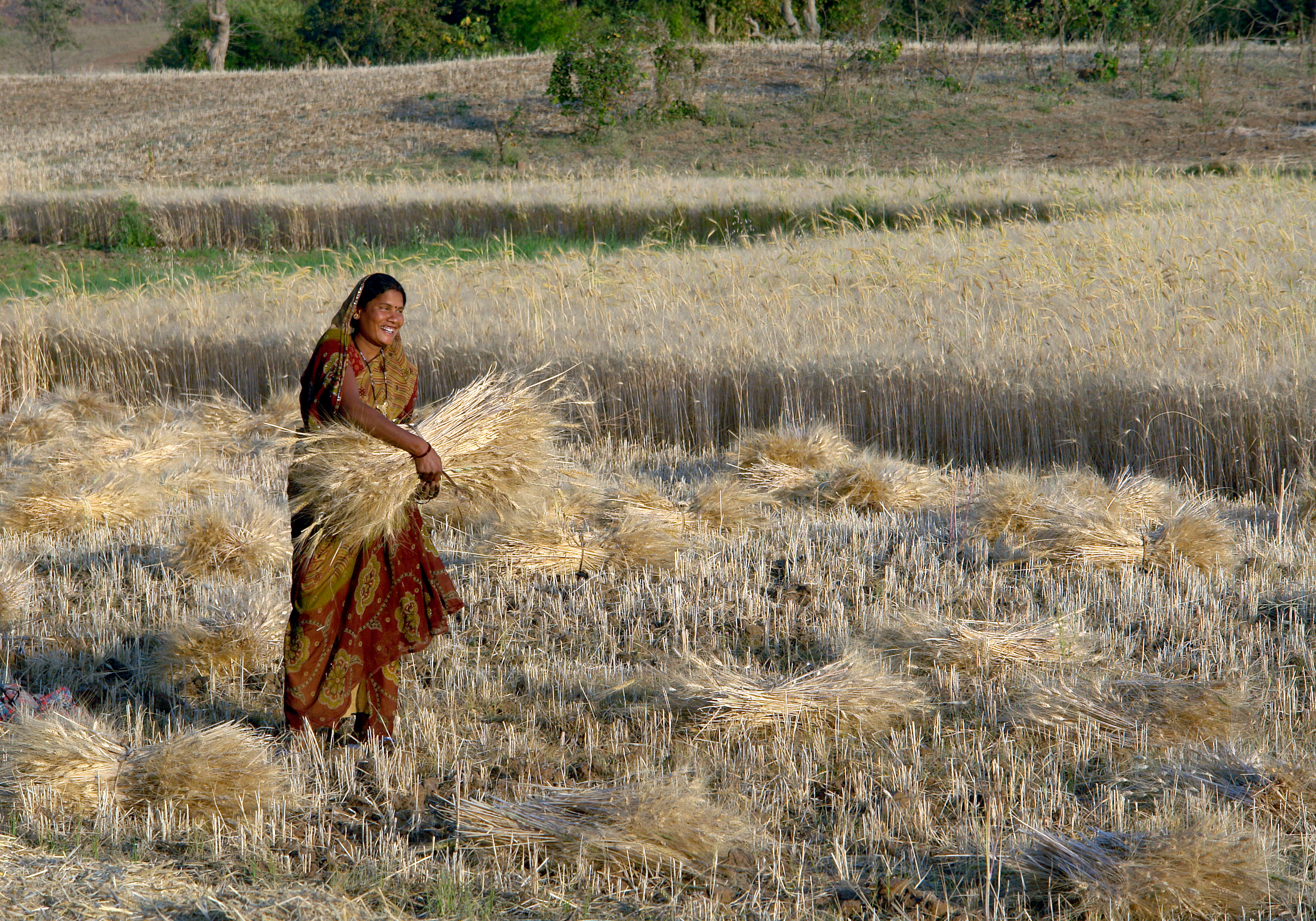
Woman harvesting wheat, Raisen district, Madhya Pradesh, India

Extreme climatic changes are among the factors that have begun to jeopardize agricultural production globally. India's agricultural sector which depends greatly on the variations in climate and weather is defined mainly by the monsoon season. The appropriate levels of precipitation that last from June to September, predicate a bountiful agricultural yield later on in the year. Monsoon seasons with insufficient or excessive precipitation, hurts the agricultural sector. Increasing temperatures and erratic precipitation has begun to exhaust agricultural land and create high variations of land. In the past couple of years, these trends have made a noticeable impact in India, causing droughts and unpredictable rainfall. Just one season of such weather patterns can be devastating to the livelihood of farmers, who can find no resilience in small farms.

The loss of biodiversity in India and specifically food crops is a serious concern of food security and sustainability of the agricultural sector in India. The connection between women farmers and environmental health is not simply for subsistence and survival. It also stems from a long-existing cultural valuation of India's agricultural fertility in ritual and practice. Women's connection to land is reflected in their almanac-like knowledge of plant varieties. Rituals and ceremonies in various parts of the country show this close relationship. There is Lohri, the harvest festival of Punjab or navadhanya puja, which translates to the worship of nine cereals, celebrations that take place in southern India. Both ceremonies celebrate the role of women in agriculture and fertility and importance of environment and biodiversity.

Furthermore, traditional agricultural methods heavily utilized by women subsistence farmers boast environmentally friendly features, such as seed preservation, natural fertilizers and crop rotation techniques that do not exhaust delicate soil. In the wake of Green Revolution's reforms, it is clear that many of the high yield recommendations had severe environmental impacts. The negative environmental impacts of the Green Revolution are barely beginning to show their full affect. The widespread chemical pollution in communities that utilize pesticides and herbicides is creating a public health problem, which has disproportionately impacted women.

In the state of Punjab, which was touted as a success of Green Revolution, cancer rates have skyrocketed. A 2008 study by Punjabi University a high rate of genetic damage among farmers, which was attributed to pesticide use. Ignorance on the appropriate use of pesticides, resulting in the heavy use, improper disposal, the use of pesticides as kitchen containers, and contamination of drinking water with heavy metals are contributing factors. In reaction to the health and monetary costs of inorganic farming many women are turning to organic farming practices. On a micro level women are organizing into collectives to exchange knowledge, organize organic seed sharing, to pursue organic and sustainable agricultural practices.

== Cooperatives ==
Cooperatives have been long seen as a social institution providing partnership, solidarity and resources to women farmers as well as tackle gender inequality. In India they have had quite a success. In many instances in which women are barred from participation, women only cooperatives are critical in empowering and educating. Yet female participation in cooperatives is still relatively low and some argue because men are still seen as primarily in charge of agriculture and income generation. Only 7.5% of women participate in cooperatives as compared to 92.5% of men. Of India's 450,000 cooperatives with a membership of 204.5 million, there are only 8,171 women cooperatives with a total membership of 693,000 women.

Despite that, women-only cooperatives, which include cooperative banks, stores, food vendors, have done quite well and provided a whole range of services to their members. In India, with a view to involve women in the process of decision-making in local self-governing bodies including cooperatives, a 33% representation has been instituted and in a number of states all boards of directors have women serving on them. International organizations such as the Self-Employed Women's Association (SEWA) have been working quite successfully in India with partners to form a membership of 1.24 million women in India. Fifty-four percent of members are agricultural workers.

== India-EU Free Trade Agreement ==
Since 2007, India and the European Union have been in negotiation over a free trade agreement between the two bodies. It is an extension of the neoliberal policies posed by the International Monetary Fund and World Bank as developmentally advantageous to India. However, in the long run it is predicted that the EU-India FTA will not bring gains to the agricultural sector of India. Rather it is predicted by a study conducted by the Centre for Trade and Development in 2009, that the EU will benefit at the expense of the small Indian agricultural laborers and farmers. It is predicted there will be a small increase in agricultural exports that will be dwarfed by larger increase in agricultural imports. In addition, agricultural employment will decline in India. Furthermore, there is concern about the social impacts of opening up of the Indian market to European Unions agricultural goods such as general and specialty food crops.

The Free Trade Agreement may lead to increased imports of the products that women are typically involved in, such as cereal production, tea or coffee, confections, and oil seeds. With the EU's competitive advantage this will hurt a number of women farmers and laborers that are employed in these sectors. For example, EU dairy products, a heavily protected industry in the EU, will most likely enter Indian markets competing with smaller animal husbandry production methods specifically attached to women. Competition may threaten women's and their families’ livelihoods and create problems of food security and deepen gender inequality by stifling the expansion of capabilities for girls and women. Agro processing, the creation of cereals and grains mixtures, in India is a large employer of women workers and strong competition can adversely affect them. In addition, since the EU has considerably lower tariffs than those in India, the FTA will induce a loss of tariff revenue in India, which will have to reduce tariffs. This will bring about a loss of revenue source generally used by the government on social spending.

The FTA, as insisted by the EU, will also remove export restrictions and increase the liberalization of investment in agriculture in India. This does not bode well for smaller Indian agricultural production industries that have thus far been insulated from such rough competition for resources. As foreign investors begin to vye for power over agricultural or natural resources in India, women's access to resources and decision-making abilities will be further threatened. Women who do agricultural work for subsistence will be at risk of losing the basic resources such as water, seeds and other natural resources used to feed their families.

The Free Trade Agreement is still under negotiations. Since initial discussion of the free trade agreement, there has been a major public outcry due to problems, besides those agricultural cited above, that are predicted to arise. In April 2013, Germany supported the free trade agreement. Progress on the FTA has been delayed due to EU demands that India open its markets further. Europe currently waits on India to raise its cap on "FDI by foreign insurance companies from 26 to 49 per cent" and also decrease import duties for luxury items such as cars, wine and spirits.

== See also ==
- Domestic violence in India
- Dowry system in India
- Female foeticide in India
- Gender inequality in India
- Gender pay gap in India
- Men's rights movement in India
- National Commission for Women
- Rape in India
- Welfare schemes for women in India
- Women in India
- Women in Indian Armed Forces
- Women's Reservation Bill
- Women's suffrage in India
- Women in Asia
