= Gender pay gap in India =

Disparity in earnings between women and men

The gender pay gap in India refers to the difference in earnings between women and men in the paid workforce and the broader labour market. Gender differences in earnings have been documented across both the formal and informal sectors of the Indian economy. Women's participation in the labour market has historically been lower than men's, although the female Labour Force Participation Rate (LFPR) increased to approximately 40.0% in 2025, according to the Periodic Labour Force Survey (PLFS).

Research has attributed the gender pay gap in India to a combination of factors, including occupational segregation, differences in labour force participation, educational access, social norms, unpaid domestic and care work, and discrimination in the labour market. The Global Gender Gap Report 2025 published by the World Economic Forum ranked India 131st out of 148 countries for overall gender parity, with comparatively low performance in the area of economic participation and opportunity. Studies have also reported gender disparities in remuneration at senior corporate levels, including among company directors and key managerial personnel.

India ratified the Equal Remuneration Convention of the International Labour Organization in 1958. The convention informed the enactment of the Equal Remuneration Act, 1976, which sought to ensure equal remuneration for men and women performing the same or similar work. The Act was later incorporated into the Code on Wages, 2019, which prohibits discrimination on the basis of gender in matters relating to wages.

== History and contributing factors ==
The female labor participation rate in India from 1901 to 1951 was between 28 and 34 percent, which is higher than the level of participation observed in 1990. This rate also varies from state to state. Regions in northern India (which have been observed to be more patriarchal) have lower participation rates for women than the states in southern India, where women have more freedom to participate in the formal economy. SEWA (the Self Employed Women's Association) recently found that the average wage of women workers was Rs. 1815 while the average wage for men was Rs. 3842.

Some of the main factors that contribute to the existing gender pay gap in India are:

=== Occupational preferences ===
The rate of female participation in the paid labor market is generally low, and is primarily concentrated in rural areas in the agricultural sector. In rural north India, it has been observed that labor is divided sharply on the basis of gender. Certain activities in agriculture have been assigned specifically to women, like drying and storing the grain, while other tasks like plowing and harvesting are only performed by men. This is a mere preference and not domination. Female labor participation in India has been observed to be higher in sectors involving personal services and care work, and is also higher in informal sectors, especially in agriculture. Studies have also found that more than sixty percent of contributing factors of gender pay gap in India stem from pure labor market discrimination, with the gap steadily decreasing on moving towards higher end of wage distribution, pointing out towards the existence of 'sticky floors' in the Indian labor market.

=== Cultural barrier ===
While social and cultural norms vary from state to state within India, one commonality that has been observed is the exclusion of women from the paid labor market and status based segregation of labor. Ironically, women from higher castes faced more difficulty when they tried to obtain paid work, even if their survival depended on it. In interviews conducted with widows from rural North India, they stated that if attempts were made to seek gainful employment outside their homes, they would be forced to give up their property rights and made to leave the villages they live in, indicating that paid work was not a feasible option even to sustain themselves due to the existing social norms. Because childcare is viewed primarily as a woman's job, women often take part-time jobs or take time off during their careers to care for their families. When women return to work after a break, they are paid lower wages than their male colleagues. Women employed full-time ordinarily already earned 34% less than men, but when compared to part-time working women, the pay gap further increased as they earned almost 42% less than men. Additionally, even if women do not have children, it has been observed that they still face pay discrimination as they are viewed as potential mothers, who may require a break from work in the near future.

=== Education and training ===
The literacy rate for women in India is far lower than the rate for men, and it has been observed that many girls drop out of school and fail to fully complete their education. Investment in education and training has also been strongly in favor of men as they are brought up with the expectation of being bread earners, and hence this investment is considered necessary for their success, while women are instead viewed as "future homemakers" for whom education may not be as essential. This difference between male and female education has been reduced in past years as the country has developed where in 2001 the difference between literacy percentage of male and female was 21.59 and in 2011 was decreased to 16.68, which shows that women are getting more opportunities as the time progresses.

=== Unpaid work ===
According to the Human Development Report 1995, women spend about two-thirds of their working time on unpaid work, while men spend only one-fourth of their time towards unpaid labor. It has been estimated in India that women on average work twenty-one more hours than men during each week. Agriculture currently accounts for over two-thirds of the current employment in India, but most of the work women contribute to this sector is not accounted for or officially documented. This again, does not take into consideration the total population of men and women in the workforce.

== Legislative protections ==
=== International obligations ===
India has been a permanent member of the ILO Governing Body from 1922. In September 1958, India ratified the C100 Equal Remuneration Convention, 1951 (No. 100), which addressed the issue of equal pay between men and women for work of equal value. This convention requires all member states to direct their national laws and policies towards guaranteeing equal remuneration to all workers, regardless of gender. In an attempt to ensure compliance with this convention and in response to the Report by the Committee on status of women in India, the government enacted the Equal Remuneration Act.

=== Equal Remuneration Act, 1976 ===
In 1976, the Equal Remuneration Act was passed with the aim of providing equal remuneration to men and women workers and to prevent discrimination on the basis of gender in all matters relating to employment and employment opportunities. This legislation not only provides women with a right to demand equal pay, but any inequality with respect to recruitment processes, job training, promotions, and transfers within the organization can also be challenged under this Act. However, its scope does not extend to situations where: (i) a woman is attempting to comply with the requirements of laws giving women special treatment; and (ii) a woman is being accorded special treatment on account of the birth of a child, or the terms and conditions relating to retirement, marriage or death. Companies and individual employers can both be held accountable to maintain the standards prescribed under this Act. In various cases, the Supreme Court of India has also held that discrimination on the basis of gender only arises when men and women perform the same work or work of a similar nature. However, it clarified that a flexible approach is required to be taken while deciding which kinds of work may be similar by considering the duties actually performed as a part of the job, and not the duties potentially capable of being performed.

=== Constitutional protections ===
As part of its Directive Principles of State Policy, the Constitution of India through Article 39 envisages that all states ideally direct their policy towards securing equal pay for equal work for both men and women, and also ensuring that men and women have the right to an adequate means of livelihood. While these Directive Principles are not enforceable by any court of law, they are crucial to the governance of the country and a state is duty bound to consider them while enacting laws.

While “equal pay for equal work” is not expressly a constitutional right, it has been read into the Constitution through the interpretation of Articles 14, 15 and 16 – which guarantee equality before the law, protection against discrimination and equality of opportunity in matters of public employment. The Supreme Court of India has also declared this to be a constitutional goal, available to every individual and capable of being attained through the enforcement of their fundamental rights set out in Articles 14 through 16. In a popular Supreme Court decision, the conditions of employment of the air-hostesses of Air India was challenged. The terms of employment required the mandatory retirement of females: (i) upon attaining the age of 33; (ii) if they were married within four years of service; or (iii) upon their first pregnancy. The court however struck down these provisions and held them to be arbitrary and discriminatory as it violated Articles 14, 15 and 16 of the Constitution.

=== Ancillary legislation ===
While legislation like the Maternity Benefit Act, 1961 and the Factories Act, 1948 do not directly address the issue of equal pay for equal work, they provide certain additional benefits a woman can claim. The Maternity Benefit Act applies to all establishments with more than ten employees. However, in states where the Employees’ State Insurance Act applies, employers no longer have any liability under the Maternity Benefit Act. Under this Act, a pregnant woman worker is entitled to 26 weeks of fully paid maternity leave, and six weeks in case of miscarriage or termination of pregnancy. Pregnant women also have the right to not perform physically arduous work, which may affect their pregnancy, and no deductions can be made from their wages because of this. Additionally, as per the Factories Act, employers are required to provide childcare for children under 6 years old at all worksites that employ over 30 women.

== Statistics ==
Note that all the following statistics do not account for informal sector work, which is 84.6% of all workers in India as of 2013. They are also based on an online volunteer survey, which skews the data to only include people with Internet access.

=== By state ===
The gender pay gap varies across Indian states, and is the highest in the following states:

State	Women's earnings as compared to men's earnings, as of 2013
Bihar	63% less than men
Chhattisgarh	48% less than men
Assam	48% less than men
Himachal Pradesh	45% less than men
Rajasthan and Kerala	44% less than men

Uttarakhand on the other hand is the state with the lowest percentage of gender pay gap, with females earning only 9% less than males. Punjab and Uttar Pradesh are also states with a lower gender pay gap, following with 10% and 15%, respectively.

=== By age ===
The gender pay gap increases with age, so that older women face a higher disparity than younger women. Women in the 18-30 age group earned 23.07% less than their male counterparts as of 2013, while women 41 and older earned 30.24% less.

=== By education ===
Among people with no formal education, the gender pay gap is actually reversed, with women earning slightly more than men. This is also true for people who have completed less than 10th standard. At all higher levels, women earn less than men as of 2013, and this increases at higher education levels. The highest disparity is at the CA/CS/ICWA or equivalent level, where women earn 44% less than men as of 2013.

Education level	Women's earnings as compared to men's earnings, as of 2013
No formal education	12% more than men
Below 10th standard	9% more than men
Advanced certificate or diploma	10% less than men
Plus 2 or equivalent	14% less than men
3-year degree (B.Sc., B.A., B.Com, BBA, and others)	16% less than men
4- or 5-year degree (BE, MBBS, LLB, etc.)	28% less than men
Master's degree	41% less than men
CA/CS/ICWA or equivalent	44% less than men
PhD or equivalent	29% less than men

=== By occupation ===
Industry (formal sector only)	Women's earnings as compared to men's earnings, as of 2013
Mining and quarrying	8.0% more than men
Agriculture, forestry, and fishing	7.6% more than men
Accommodation and food service	4.2% less than men
Administrative and support service	9.2% less than men
Public administration and defence	14.7% less than men
Education	20.1% less than men
Finance and insurance	21.2% less than men
Other service activities	23.6% less than men
Real estate	26.7% less than men
Human health and social work	26.8% less than men
Construction	31.1% less than men
Information and communication	35.3% less than men
Manufacturing	39.1% less than men
Arts, entertainment, and recreation	41.2% less than men

== Impact ==
Research suggests that when countries are able to raise the female labor participation rate, this stands to benefit the entire economy. Apart from potential GDP growth, equal employment opportunities for women could also result in increased growth and profitability in the private sector. In countries where the population is aging quickly, an increase in the female labor participation rate would help offset the negative effects of a declining workforce. It is also important to note that women in India perform 9.8 times the amount of labor in the unpaid sector either through household duties or care work. If this work was measured and valued, it was estimated by McKinsey that it would contribute 0.3 trillion dollars to India's total economic output.

== See also ==
Pay and work related

- Equal pay for equal work
- Gender inequality in India
- Gender pay gap
- Indian labor law
- Labor in India
- Social issues in India
- Women in India
- Women in Asia

Women in India related

- Domestic violence in India
- Dowry system in India
- Female foeticide in India
- Gender inequality in India
- Men's rights movement in India
- National Commission for Women
- Rape in India
- Sexism in India
- Welfare schemes for women in India
- Women in agriculture in India
- Women in India
- Women in Indian Armed Forces
- Women's Reservation Bill
- Women's suffrage in India
