= Holy Angels' Convent Trivandrum =

Location
- Thiruvananthapuram; Kerala; India; 8.4981°N 76.9431°E

Information
- Motto: Love all; Serve all
- Established: 1880
- Founder: Venerable Mother Mary Theresa Veronica of the Passion
- School district: Thiruvananthapuram
- Manager: Rev. Sr. Angel Thomas
- Principal: Sr. Sebin Fernandez
- Gender: Female
- Enrollment: 3000
- Houses: Red, Blue, Green, Yellow
- Nickname: HAC
- Website: www.holyangelstvm.org

The Holy Angels' Convent Higher Secondary School is one of the oldest educational institutions in the city of Thiruvananthapuram, the capital of the Kerala state in India.

== History ==
This school for girls was opened on 10 November 1880 by Mother Elias from Ireland. She was the foundress of the Congregation of the Carmelite Religious (C.C.R).

In 1888, the school was the first girls' school in South India to present students for the Matriculation Examination of Madras University. In 1896, the school was upgraded to a second-grade college. But this college section was closed in 1906.

== Present day ==
The school boasts of a strength of over 6000 students, mostly girls. Admission to the boys is restricted up to the VI standard and the admission is increasing every year to 7,8,9,10,+1,+2 for boys. English is used as primary medium of communication and use of Malayalam for the same is limited. Senior students speak only English within the campus. The school has a library of over 20,000 books.(now more than 20,000) fully equipped and upgraded computer labs, (laboratory facilities only for +1and +2) .Huge sprawling buildings and beautiful gardens. Boarding facilities are also available here(now construction going on ...).

The school follows the house system consisting of four houses : Blue, Green, Yellow and Red in names of their patrons. The housing system increases the efficiency of students in curricular as well as extracurricular activities.

== Notable former pupils ==
- Vidhu Prathap
- Suchitra Murali
- Divya S. Iyer
- Asha Sinha
- Pearle Maaney
- Nyla Usha
- Ahaana Krishna
- Mary Poonen Lukose
- Annie (actress)
- Arya (actress)
- Aishwarya Lekshmi
