= Asha Sinha =

Indian police general

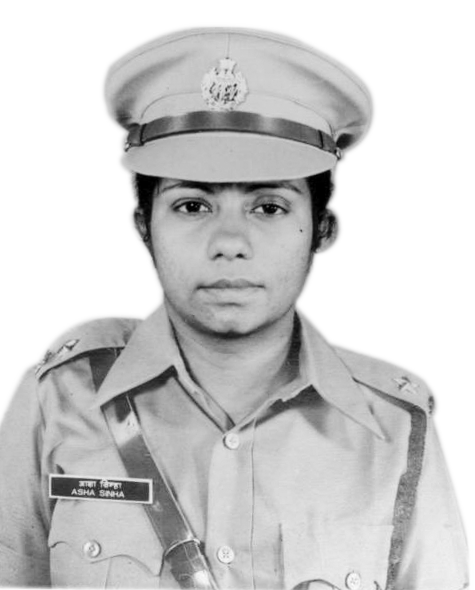
- First Lady Commandant of a Paramilitary Force in India
- Born: Asha Thampan; 24 March 1956 (age 70); Kottayam, Kerala
- Education: MA (Economics)
- Alma mater: Government College for Women, Thiruvananthapuram
- Occupation: Indian Police Service
- Office: Director General of Police
- Spouse: Sanjoy Sinha
- Children: 2
- Parent(s): P K Thampan and Valsamma Thampan
- Awards: Police Medal for Meritorious Service.

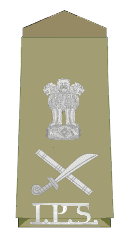
Insignia of an Indian Police Service officer with rank of Director General of Police

Asha Sinha is a former Director General of Police in Jharkhand Police. She has the distinction of being appointed the first Woman Commandant of any police force in the year 1992. She is a retired Indian Police Service (IPS) Officer of 1982-Batch. She has held several important assignments in the States of Maharashtra, Jharkhand, Bihar and Government of India culminating in the appointment to the senior most position, as Director General of Police in the year 2013.

== Personal life and education ==
Asha Sinha was born as Asha Thampan in Kottayam, Kerala, India to PK Thampan, a Chartered Accountant working for the Kerala State Electricity Board and Smt. Valsamma Thampan, a house maker. She did her schooling from the Holy Angel's Convent Trivandrum and completed her graduation and Post-Graduation from the Government College for Women, Thiruvananthapuram.

After a brief stint of Teaching in All Saints College, Thiruvananthapuram and S. N. College, Kannur, she qualified and joined the General Insurance Corporation of India as a Direct Recruit Asst. Administrative. She left the GIC to join the Indian Police Service in the year 1982. She met her future spouse Sanjoy Sinha at the General Insurance Company who also cleared the Civil Services in the year 1983 and joined the Indian Customs. They have two children: Abhishek Sinha, an advocate and Vaishnavi Sinha, a journalist.

== Career ==
Asha Sinha joined the Indian Police Service in 1982 and has served the country in several capacities for almost 34 years. She has served the Union Central Government and also the State governments of Maharashtra, Bihar and Jharkhand.

As an IPS Officer she held various positions Asst. Superintendent of Police, Patna. Sub-Divisional Police Officer, Sitamarhi, Bihar, S.P, C.I.D, Bihar. After her Services were loaned to the Government of Maharashtra, she served as Chief Editor, Dakshata and thereafter for three years she was posted in the Anti-Corruption Bureau, DCP-I, Greater Mumbai.

After completing her State to State Deputation with the Government of Maharashtra, she returned to the parent cadre. Thereafter she was selected for deputation to C.I.S.F and was posted as Commandant, C.I.S.F, Mazagon Dock Shipbuilders Limited, a sensitive defence installation in the year 1992, thereby earning the distinction of becoming the First Lady Commandant of any Para-Military Force in India. She later held the posts of Group Commandant, C.I.S.F looking after the security of large Public Sector Undertakings of Pimpri, Nava Sheva Port, Raigad.

After being allotted Jharkhand Cadre, she held several important assignments for the State including D.I.G. (Special Branch), D.I.G (H.R), Inspector General (C.I.D), After promotion assignments held by her were Inspector General (Training), Addtl. Director General (Special Branch), Addtl Director General (C.I.D), After promotion to the Highest Ranks she held the positions of Director General and Commandant General (Home Guard and Fire Services) and Director General (Training).

== Achievements ==
Mrs Asha Sinha chartered history by becoming the first lady officer to command a Para-Military force in India, as commandant, C.I.S.F, Mazagoan Docks, Mumbai. She also became the first I.P.S Lady Officer to head the Intelligence Department in Special Branch and later Crime Investigation Department (C.I.D) in the State of Jharkhand. After the tragic killing of Inspector Francis Indwar by the Naxalites in 2009 which was a huge Intelligence failure, Mrs Asha Sinha was chosen to head the State Intelligence Wing. She not only restored the unit's sagging morale but also saw to it that the Lok Sabha (Parliament) and Vidhan Sabha (State Assembly) elections in 2009 was relatively incident free, in spite of the Naxalite threats.

== Awards ==
In recognition of her services she was awarded the Presidents Medal for Meritorious Service in the year 2010.

== Sources ==
- http://www.ashasinha.in/
- https://www.jhpolice.gov.in/medals/smt-asha-sinha-15193-1367846379
- https://jhpolice.gov.in/sites/default/files/documents-reports/jhpolice_IPS-disposition-list_100815.pdf
- https://www.business-standard.com/article/pti-stories/reshuffle-in-jharkhand-police-department-113031100643_1.html
- https://news.webindia123.com/news/articles/india/20091018/1363721.html
- https://informatics.nic.in/news/341
- https://dtf.in/wp-content/files/Indian_Police_Service_IPS_-_Civil_List_2014.htm
- https://www.dailypioneer.com/2014/state-editions/company-commanders-take-oath-of-service.html
- https://www.jhpolice.gov.in/news/आशा-सिन्हा-डीजी-और-एसएन-प्रधान-एडीजी-बने-14127-1363071091
- https://jhpolice.gov.in/cid-adgp-succession-board
- https://122.15.233.169/news/रांची-में-चल-रहा-यातायात-जागरुकता-अभियान-23987-1431689789
- http://viewpointjharkhand.com/2015/06/12/कंपनी-कमांडर-को-शपथ-दिलाय/
- https://www.jhpolice.gov.in/news/डीजी-प्रशि0-आशा-सिन्हा-को-जैप-वन-ग्राउंड-में-दी-गई-विदाई-26270-1459422534
- https://www.bhaskar.com/news/c-181-1892186-ra0024-NOR.html
- http://www.svpnpa.gov.in/memories/alumni-gallery/378-1982-batch
