= Welfare schemes for women in India =

Under Article 15(3), the Constitution of India allows for positive discrimination in favor of women. The article, under right to equality, states that: "Nothing in this article shall prevent the State from making any special provision for women and children." In addition, the Directive Principles of State Policy 39(A) states that: "The State shall, in particular, direct its policy towards securing that the citizens, men and women equally, have the right to an adequate means of livelihood."

The Rashtriya Mahila Kosh (National Credit Fund for Women) was set up in 1993 to make credit available for lower income women in India. More recent programs initiated by the Government of India include the Mother and Child Tracking System (MCTS), the Indira Gandhi Matritva Sahyog Yojana, Conditional Maternity Benefit plan (CMB), as well as the Rajiv Gandhi Scheme for Empowerment of Adolescent Girls – Sabla.

== Mother and Child Tracking System (MCTS) ==
The Mother and Child Tracking System was launched in 2009, helps to monitor the health care system to ensure that all mothers and their children have access to a range of services, including pregnancy care, medical care during delivery, and immunizations. The system consists of a database of all pregnancies registered at health care facilities and birth since 1 December 2009.

== Pradhan Mantri Matritva Vandana Yojana ==
Indira Gandhi Matritva Sahyog Yojana (IGMSY), Conditional Maternity Benefit (CMB) is a scheme sponsored by the national government for pregnant and lactating women age 19 and over for their first two live births. The programme, which began in October 2010, provides money to help ensure the good health and nutrition of the recipients. As of March 2013 the program is being offered in 53 districts around the country.

== Rajiv Gandhi Scheme for Empowerment of Adolescent Girls (RGSEAG) ==
The Rajiv Gandhi Scheme for Empowerment of Adolescent Girls (RGSEAG) is an initiative launched on 1 April 2011 to offer benefits to adolescent girls in the age group of 10 to 19. It was offered initially as a pilot programme in 200 districts and offers a variety of services to help young women including nutritional supplementation and education, health education and services, and life skills and vocational training.

== Rashtriya Mahila Kosh ==
Rashtriya Mahila Kosh (National Credit Fund for Women) was established by Government of India in 1993. Its purpose is to deliver women from lower income group with access to loans to begin small businesses.

== National Action Plan for Children ==
The National Action Plan for Children was initiated in 2017, this scheme was launched by the Ministry of Women and Child Development.

== Digital Laado (Giving digital wings to daughters) ==
The initiative started with the association of FICCI and Digital Unlocked to empower women to learn on digital platforms. According to Government of India, 65% girls drop out from completing higher education. The program is a nationwide initiative in which every girl will be taught and trained to develop their talent and skills to work from home itself and get connected with the global platform.

== Priyadarshini free travel scheme ==
Priyadarshini is a scheme of the Government of Kerala, India, under which women and transgender persons travel free on ordinary-class buses operated by the Kerala State Road Transport Corporation (KSRTC).

== See also ==
- Women in India
- Women in Indian Armed Forces
