= Domestic violence in India =

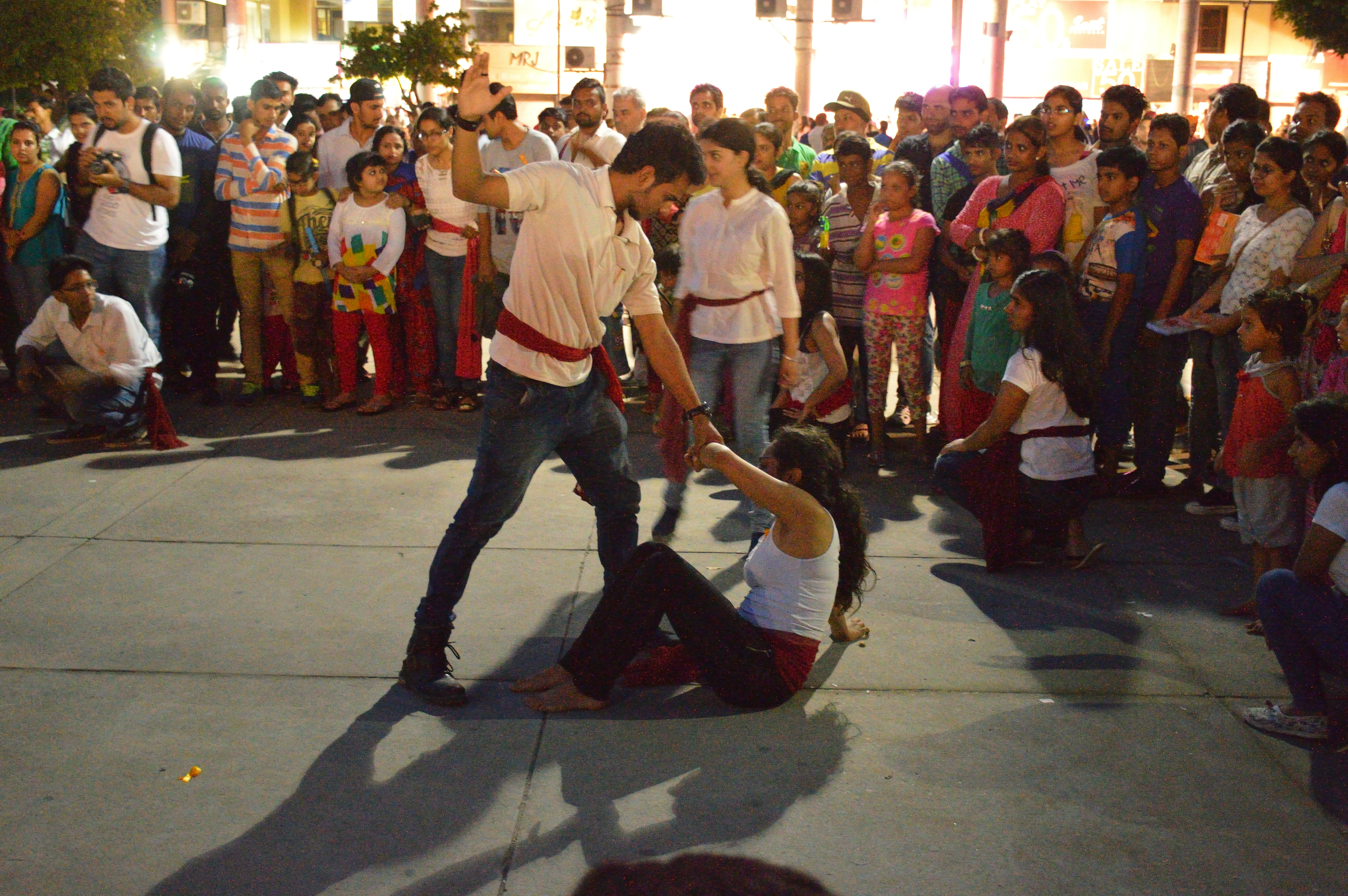
A street theatre performance on domestic violence at the Bridge Market plaza in Chandigarh.

Domestic violence in India includes any form of violence suffered by a person from a biological relative but typically is the violence suffered by a woman by male members of her family or relatives. Although men also suffer domestic violence, the law under IPC 498A specifically protects only women. Specifically only a woman can file a case of domestic violence.

According to a National Family and Health Survey in 2005, total lifetime prevalence of domestic violence was 33.5% and 8.5% for sexual violence among women aged 15–49. A 2014 study in The Lancet reports that although the reported sexual violence rate in India is among the lowest in the world, the large population of India means that the violence affects 27.5 million women over their lifetimes. However, an opinion survey among experts carried out by the Thomson Reuters Foundation ranked India as the most dangerous country in the world for women.

The 2012 National Crime Records Bureau report of India states a reported crime rate of 46 per 100,000, rape rate of 2 per 100,000, dowry homicide rate of 0.7 per 100,000 and the rate of domestic cruelty by husband or his relatives as 5.9 per 100,000. These reported rates are significantly smaller than the reported intimate partner domestic violence rates in many countries, such as the United States (590 per 100,000) and reported homicide (6.2 per 100,000 globally), crime and rape incidence rates per 100,000 women for most nations tracked by the United Nations.

There are several domestic violence laws in India. The earliest law was the Dowry Prohibition Act 1961 which made the act of giving and receiving dowry a crime. In an effort to bolster the 1961 law, two new sections, Section 498A and Section 304B were introduced into the Indian Penal Code in 1983 and 1986. The most recent legislation is the Protection of Women from Domestic Violence Act (PWDVA) 2005. The PWDVA, a civil law, includes physical, emotional, sexual, verbal, and economic abuse as domestic violence.

== Background ==
Domestic violence, or intimate partner violence (IPV) as it is sometimes called, is a worldwide problem. Domestic abuse includes physical, emotional and sexual violence of any form. In India, the PWDVA also includes economic abuse under the definition of domestic violence. A 1999 study examined the prevalence and characteristics of domestic abuse in five districts of northern India during 1995–1996. The study reported that in those five districts, lifetime prevalence of domestic abuse ranged from 18% to 45%.

=== Definition ===
Domestic violence is currently defined in India by the Protection of Women from Domestic Violence Act of 2005. According to Section 3 of the Act, "any act, omission or commission or conduct of the respondent shall constitute domestic violence in case it:

1. harms or injures or endangers the health, safety, life, limb or well-being, whether mental or physical, of the aggrieved person or tends to do so and includes causing physical abuse, sexual abuse, verbal and emotional abuse and economic abuse; or
2. harasses, harms, injures or endangers the aggrieved person with a view to coerce her or any other person related to her to meet any unlawful demand for any dowry or other property or valuable security; or
3. has the effect of threatening the aggrieved person or any person related to her by any conduct mentioned in clause (a) or clause (b); or
4. otherwise injures or causes harm, whether physical or mental, to the aggrieved person.”

2005 it was made illegal Jammu and Kashmir, which has its own laws, has enacted in 2010 the Jammu and Kashmir Protection of Women from Domestic Violence Act, 2010.

=== 2006 NFHS survey report on domestic sexual violence ===
The National Family Health Survey of India in 2006 estimated the lifetime prevalence of sexual violence among women aged 15–49, including instances of marital rape in India. The study included in its definition of "sexual violence" all instances of a woman experiencing her husband "physically forcing her to have sexual intercourse with him even when she did not want to; and, forcing her to perform any sexual acts she did not want to". The study sampled 83,703 women nationwide, and determined that 8.5% of women in the 15–49 age group had experienced sexual violence in their lifetime. This figure includes all forms of forced sexual activity by husband on wife, during their married life, but not recognised as marital rape by Indian law.

The 2006 NFHS study reported sexual violence to be lowest against women in the 15–19 age group, and urban women reporting 6% lifetime prevalence rate of sexual violence, while 10% of rural women reported experiencing sexual violence in their lifetime. Women with ten years of education experienced sharply less sexual violence, compared to women with less education. The total of some 83703 women took part and of 67426 Hindu women who took part in it 22453, that is equal to 33.3% respondents said yes to being physically abused at their home, similar is the case of Buddhist women where 40% women said yes to being physically abused.

Religion	Participants	Percentage who experienced violence
Hinduism	67,426	33.7
Buddhism	681	40.9
Sikhism	1,492	26.1
Jainism	264	12.6
Islam	11,396	34.6
Christianity	2,039	27.8
Others	333	36.3

A 2014 study in The Lancet states, "Whereas an 8.5% prevalence of sexual violence in the country [India] is among the lowest in the world, it is estimated to affect 27.5 million women in India [given India's large population]". Further, the 2006 survey found that 85% of women who suffered sexual violence, in or outside of marriage, never sought help, and only 1% report it to the police.

=== Data reliability ===
Renuka Chowdhury, former Union minister for Women and Child Development, stated in 2006, that around 70% of women in India are victims of domestic violence. According to a BBC report, in 2013, around 309,546 crimes were reported against women of which 118,866 were for domestic violence alone.

== Forms ==
The map shows the comparative rate of violence against women in Indian states and union territories in 2012. Crime rate data per 100,000 women in this map is the broadest definition of crime against women under Indian law. It includes rape, sexual assault, insult to modesty, kidnapping, abduction, cruelty by intimate partner or relatives, trafficking, persecution for dowry, dowry deaths, indecency, and all other crimes listed in Indian Penal Code.

=== Physical violence ===
Physical injury is the most visible form of domestic violence. The scope of physical domestic/intimate partner violence includes slapping, pushing, kicking, biting, hitting, throwing objects, strangling, beating, threatening with any form of weapon, or using a weapon. Worldwide, the percentage of women who suffer serious injuries as a result of physical domestic violence tends to range from 19% – 55%. Physical injuries as a result of domestic violence against women are more obvious than psychological ones, and can be more easily discerned by health professionals as well as courts of law in the context of legal prosecution.

=== Emotional abuse ===
Emotional abuse has been gaining more and more recognition in recent years as an incredibly common form of domestic violence (and therefore a human rights abuse) within the private home throughout developing nations such as India. Psychological abuse can erode a woman's sense of self-worth and can be incredibly harmful to overall mental and physical wellbeing. Emotional/psychological abuse can include harassment; threats; verbal abuse such as name-calling, degradation and blaming; stalking; and isolation.

Women who experience domestic violence overwhelmingly tend to have greater overall emotional distress, as well as disturbingly high occurrences of suicidal thoughts and attempts. According to a study by the National Centre for Biotechnology Information, suicide attempts in India are correlated with physical and psychological intimate partner violence. Of the Indian women who participated in the study, 7.5% reported attempting suicide. This correlation is supported by the high rates of domestic violence in India, although the rates differ greatly by region, individual socioeconomic status and other factors.

=== Sexual assault ===
Domestic sexual assault is a form of domestic violence involving sexual/reproductive coercion and marital rape. Under Indian law, marital rape is not a crime, except during the period of marital separation of the partners.

The Section 375 of the Indian Penal Code (IPC) considers the forced sex in marriages as a crime only when the wife is below 15. Thus, marital rape is not a criminal offense under IPC. The marital rape victims have to take recourse to the Protection of Women from Domestic Violence Act 2005 (PWDVA). The PWDVA, which came into force in 2006, outlaws marital rape. However, it offers only a civil remedy for the offence.

=== Honour killing ===
An honour killing is the practice wherein an individual is killed by one or more family member(s), because he or she is believed to have brought shame on the family. The shame may range from refusing to enter an arranged marriage, having sex outside marriage, being in a relationship that is disapproved by the family, starting a divorce proceeding, or engaging in homosexual relations.

In 2010, the Supreme Court of India issued notice seeking data and explanation for rise in honor killings to the states of Punjab, Haryana, Bihar, Uttar Pradesh, Rajasthan, Jharkhand, Himachal Pradesh and Madhya Pradesh.

=== Dowry-related abuse and deaths ===
In almost all Hindu families, the ritual of taking dowry has caused a serious problem. A newly married brides suffer domestic violence in the form of harassment, physical abuse or death when she is thought to have not brought enough dowry with marriage. Some cases end up in suicides by hanging, self-poisoning or by fire. In dowry deaths, the groom's family is the perpetrator of murder or suicide.

According to Indian National Crime Record Bureau, in 2012, 8,233 dowry death cases were reported across India, or dowry issues cause 1.4 deaths per year per 100,000 women in India. For contextual reference, the United Nations reports a worldwide average female homicide rate of 3.6 per 100,000 women, and an average of 1.6 homicides per 100,000 women for Northern Europe in 2012.

Dowry deaths in India are not limited to any specific religion, and it is found among Hindus, Muslims, Sikhs and others. Some 80% of the total Dowry related crime found in the Hindu community followed by other Indian Religions as giving Dowry is considered as an important ritual in the traditional Hindu marriage. Furthermore, in many parts of India the Ritual of Tilak(Engagement)done mostly in Hindu families is used by Groom's Family to Demand a huge sum of money.

The Dowry Prohibition Act 1961, prohibits the request, payment or acceptance of a dowry, "as consideration for the marriage", where "dowry" is defined as a gift demanded or given as a precondition for a marriage. Gifts given without a precondition are not considered dowry and are legal. Asking or giving of dowry can be punished by imprisonment of up to six months or a fine. It replaced several pieces of anti-dowry legislation that had been enacted by various Indian states. Murder and suicide under compulsion are addressed by India's criminal penal code. The law was made more stringent with Section 498a of Indian Penal Code (enacted in 1983). Under the Protection of Women from Domestic Violence Act 2005 (PWDVA), a woman can seek help against dowry harassment by approaching a domestic violence protection officer.

== Regional, gender and religious differences ==
Kimuna et al. have published domestic violence trends in India, based on the 2005–2006 India National Family Health Survey-III (NFHS-III) data on the 69,484 ever-married women ages 15 to 49 from all regions of India. They report 31% of respondents had experienced minor to major form of physical violence in the 12 months prior to the survey, while the domestic sexual violence prevalence rate ever experienced by the woman was about 8%. Women who lived in cities, had higher household wealth, were Christian and educated had significantly lower risk of physical and sexual domestic violence. In contrast, wives of men who drank alcohol had significantly higher risks of experiencing both physical and sexual violence.

According to a study made by Michael Koenig about the determinants of domestic violence in India published by the American Journal of Public Health in 2006, higher socioeconomic status reduced domestic abuse.

=== Gender ===
Babu et al. surveyed both genders on domestic violence in eastern region of India. The results show that 16% of women had reported experiencing physical forms of domestic violence, 25% sexual form, 53% psychological, and 56% reported any form of domestic violence. Men reported being perpetrators of domestic violence with 22% reporting some form of physical domestic abuse, 17% sexual, 59% psychological, and 59.5% any form of domestic abuse. Men reported experiencing higher prevalence of all forms of violence, but reported experiencing lowest rates of sexual violence. The perpetrator of domestic violence, physical or sexual or psychological, was typically the husband in majority of cases and in some cases husbands' parents. Further, low income and low education increased the risks of domestic violence.

=== Religion ===
The National Family Health Survey of India in 2006 estimated the lifetime prevalence of sexual violence among women aged 15–49, including instances of marital rape in India. The study included in its definition of "sexual violence" all instances of a woman experiencing her husband "physically forcing her to have sexual intercourse with him even when she did not want to; and, forcing her to perform any sexual acts she did not want to".[12] The study sampled 83,703 women nationwide, and determined that 8.5% of women in the 15–49 age group had experienced sexual violence in their lifetime.[13] This figure includes all forms of forced sexual activity by husband on wife, during their married life, but not recognised as marital rape by Indian law.

In 2005–2006 nationwide family and health survey report, the lowest domestic violence prevalence rate was reported by women of Jainism religion (12.6% of women), the highest by women of Buddhist religion (40.9%). The same report also states that the frequency and intensity of domestic violence experienced was lowest among Jain women who had ever been victims of such violence.

== Dynamics ==
A map of the Indian dowry death rate per 100,000 people in 2012.

According to Unicef's Global Report Card on Adolescents 2012, 57% of boys and 53% of girls in India think a husband is justified in hitting or beating his wife.

=== Patriarchal social structure ===
There are three main aspects of the patriarchal household structure in India that affect women's agency: marriage, active discrimination by means of abuse (marital or extramarital), and diminished women's agency through limited economic opportunity through stifled opportunity for independence. In all these dimensions, there is a clear relationship between strong patriarchal familial structures and limited capabilities and agency for women, which are strongly correlated with causal factors for domestic violence such as gender disparities in nutritional deprivation and a lack of women's role in reproductive decisions.

=== Dowry system ===
Domestic violence often happens in India as a result of dowry demands. Dowry payments are another manifestation of the patriarchal structure in India. There are strong links between domestic violence and dowry, a cultural practice deeply rooted in many Indian communities, which is the money, goods, or property the woman/woman's family brings to a marriage to now become under the ownership of the husband. This practice continues even today in India although banned by law since 1961, and in recent years dowry amounts have risen dramatically.

In a 2005 study published in World Development, results from a survey pointed to a negative correlation between dowry amount and inter-spousal violence, indicating the potential dangers of a wife falling short on dowry payments or expectations. These dangers include not only common physical and emotional abuse such as hitting and continual degradation, but in some cases dowry death and bride burning as a result of the husband's dissatisfaction with the dowry payment. In fact, 8391 dowry deaths reported in 2010, a steep rise from 6995 such reported cases in 1997.

=== Under-reporting of domestic violence ===
According to Shalu Nigam, the Criminal Law Amendment Act 1983 Section 498A "criminalized cruelty within a marriage." However, many women who filed cases under section 498A of Indian Penal Code end up getting revictimized in the process. Domestic violence was often not handled as a legitimate crime or complaint, but more of a private or family matter while negating the rights of women as citizens. Myth and misogyny operate while implementing the law. But now this trend has changed. Section 498a introduced to protect women from Domestic Violence.

Caste, class, religious bias and race also determine whether action is taken or not. For example, poor or lower-caste females do not have the same access to legal enforcement or education and often have trouble getting help from law enforcement.

=== Other ===
Other factors outside culture that demonstrate differences in domestic violence prevalence and gender disparities in India include socioeconomic class, educational level, and family structure beyond the patriarchal framework. A 1999 study published by the American Journal of Epidemiology identified so-called “stress factors” that are critical to understanding varying rates of domestic violence in other scopes outside of region-specific factors. These stress-related factors within the household include low educational attainment, poverty, young initial age of marriage, having multiple children, and other limiting engendered development factors.

== Effects ==
Victims suffer many types of physical and emotional abuse as a result of illegal actions taken within the private home, and those who have experienced some form of domestic violence tend to have greater long-term mental disorders and drug dependencies than those who do not. In India, reducing domestic violence is imperative not only from an ethical and human rights perspective but also because of obvious instrumental and immediate health benefits that would be gained from such reduction.

=== Health ===
Serious health problems often result from physical, emotional, and sexual forms of domestic violence. Physical health outcomes include: Injury (from lacerations to fractures and internal organs injury), Unwanted Pregnancy, Gynaecological problems, STDs including HIV, Miscarriage, Pelvic inflammatory disease, Chronic pelvic pain, Headaches, Permanent disabilities, Asthma, Irritable bowel syndrome, Self-injurious behaviours (smoking, unprotected sex) Mental health effects can include depression, fear, anxiety, low self-esteem, sexual dysfunction, eating disorders, obsessive-compulsive disorder, or post traumatic stress disorder. Fatal effects can include suicide, homicide, maternal mortality, or HIV/AIDS.

Negative public health consequences are also strongly associated with domestic violence. Social and economic costs have been identified as direct results of these public-health consequences, and it is argued that these justify state action to act in the interest of the public to reconcile these costs (specifically including costs such as worker earnings and productivity, public healthcare, and costs associated with the criminal justice system).

=== Women's agency ===
The act of domestic violence towards women is a human rights violation as well as an illegal act under Indian law. It is therefore widely considered a threat to women's agency through any lens, and there is a growing recognition in many Indian regions that the nation can reach a higher potential through obtaining greater social and economic capital than by reducing women's participation in society. Domestic violence is one of the most significant determinants of this denial. Greater gender equality through greater women's agency cannot be achieved if basic health needs are not being met and if cultural biases that allow for domestic violence in India persist.

== Legal efforts ==
=== New sexual violence legislation ===
On 19 March 2013, the Indian Parliament passed a new law with the goal of more effectively protecting women from sexual violence in India. It came in the form of the Criminal Law (Amendment) Act, 2013, which further amends the Indian Penal Code, the Code of Criminal Procedure of 1973, the Indian Evidence Act of 1872, and the Protection of Children from Sexual Offences Act, 2012. The law makes stalking, voyeurism, acid attacks and forcibly disrobing a woman explicit crimes for the first time, provides capital punishment for rapes leading to death, and raises to 20 years from 10 the minimum sentence for gang rape and rapes committed by a police officer. The new law doesn't address marital rape, rape committed by the armed forces or rape against men.

Conservative lawmakers and anti-women's rights supporters still claim that the higher age of consent could results in abuses and wrongful arrests in statutory rape in spite of the high incidence of unreported or reported cases of sexual abuse that warrants such laws. According to a 2012 United Nations report, 47% of Indian women marry younger than 18 (the legal marriage age is 21 for men and 18 for women).

=== Gender discrimination under law ===
The domestic abuse laws are claimed to be discriminatory against men by male right activists. In particular, Section 498A, the act that criminalizes cruelty against women by husband and his relatives, has been used by anti-feminists in their arguments to justify removing any legal penalty against criminals. Men's rights activists such as the "Save the family foundation" in India argue that the law is often misused by women. However, a 2012 report on Section 498A from the Government of India found that the empirical study did not establish any disproportionate misuse of Section 498A as compared to other criminal laws. Even though misuse of Section 498A was not established, more recently the Supreme Court came out with directives that every complaint received by the police under Section 498A must be referred to a Family Welfare Committee before the police can arrest the perpetrator.

More glaringly, the law only offers reliefs to women. Men in India cannot avail of a similar legal remedy to protect themselves from domestic violence from either men or women. For men, even a simple relief of having a male or female aggressor stay away from them (a restraining or protection order) is not afforded by the current law.

But in 2016 this discrimination was removed by supreme court itself. The bench of Justices Kurian Joseph and Rohinton F Nariman ruled on 6 October 2016 (Thursday) that this provision frustrated the objective of the legislation since "perpetrators and abettors of domestic violence" can be women too. The words "adult male" has been struck down from the domestic violence act. However this new definition still did not include men as victims and was later changed back to the original.

== See also ==
- NCW to review the protection of domestic violence act
- Rape in India
- Honor killing (see detailed section on India)
- Dowry death (see detailed section on India, at start of article)
- Bride burning
- Women's health in India
- Feminism in India
- Protection of Women from Domestic Violence Act, 2005
- Domestic violence in Pakistan

General:

- Violence against women in India
- Crime in India
- Social issues in India
- Dowry system in India
- Female foeticide in India
- Gender inequality in India
- Gender pay gap in India
- Men's rights movement in India
- National Commission for Women
- Pre-Conception and Pre-Natal Diagnostic Techniques Act, 1994
- Rape in India
- Sexism in India
- Welfare schemes for women in India
- Women in agriculture in India
- Women in India
- Women in Indian Armed Forces
- Women's Reservation Bill
- Women's suffrage in India
