= Men's rights movement in India =

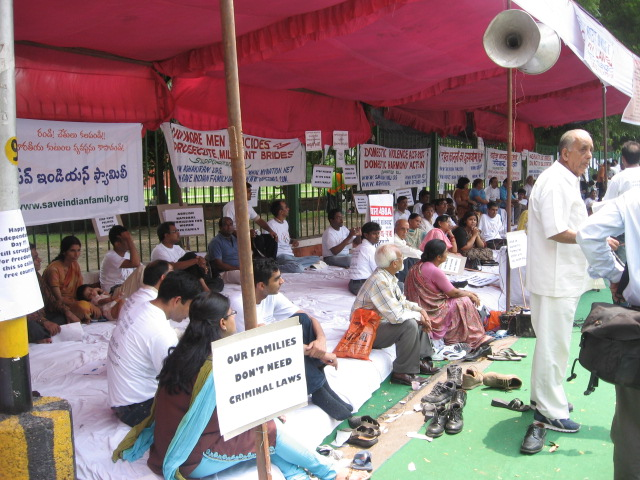
Demonstrations by the Save Indian Family Foundation about Domestic violence against men.

The men's rights movement in India is composed of various independent men's rights organisations in India. Proponents of the movement support the introduction of gender-neutral legislation and repeal of laws that they believe are biased against men.

Indian men's rights activists are organised around legal issues such as anti-dowry laws, divorce, and child custody, which they believe are biased against men. They also assert that the frequency of domestic violence against men has increased over time with many cases going unreported as men are shamed into not reporting abuse or fear false accusations against them in reprisal. Some men's rights activists also consider India's rape reporting laws and sexual harassment laws in India to be biased against men.

== History ==
=== 1990s and early 2000s ===
The first men's rights organisations in India sprouted in the 1990s in Kolkata, Mumbai, and Lucknow, with the cities respectively being home to the groups Pirito Purush (The Persecuted Man), Purush Hakka Samrakshan Samiti (Committee for the Protection of Men's Rights), and Patni Atyachar Virodhi Morcha (Protesting Torture by Wives). These groups demanded rights for men, in particular husbands, and shared the view that they needed to undo some of the reforms achieved by feminists. The three groups were formed in response to alleged abuse of Section 498A of the Indian Penal Code.

Subsequently, a helpline for battered men was started. "Save Indian Family" was founded on 9 March 2005 by the unification of a number of family's rights organisations across India. On 19 November 2007, the Save Indian Family Foundation celebrated International Men's Day for the first time in India.

=== 2006–2010 ===
In September 2008, SIFF filed a complaint against a Kitply plywood commercial to the Advertising Standards Council of India, for portraying a wife slapping her husband on her wedding day because of a creaking bed, alleging that the ad promoted domestic violence against men by portraying it as humorous. In the same month, Chennai-based organisation Indiya Kudumba Pathukappu Iyaakam, complained against a Pond's ad which labelled men as wife-beaters and an ICICI Prudential Insurance commercial which allegedly portrayed verbal and economical abuse against men.

The NGO 'Child's Right and Family Welfare' was formed in 2009 to demand fairer laws for men, including better child custody and access laws. In April 2010, when Pakistani cricketer Shoaib Malik was accused of adultery by a woman from Hyderabad, Ayesha Siddiqui, just prior to his marriage to tennis player Sania Mirza, SIFF released a statement in support of Malik demanding that his passport be returned. It added its concerns over such misuses of Section 498A of the Indian Penal Code. In 2009, the head of the Ministry of Women and Child Development, Renuka Chowdhury, agreed to meet men's rights activists to listen to their concerns about biased legislation. On 25 June 2009, the activists were invited to discuss possible changes to these laws. However, the ministry changed the agenda of the meeting on 24 June, and ministry officials announced they were "unwilling to accept any flaws in current laws." This angered the activists and resulted in a large number of complaints to the Indian government. A week later, government officials indicated they would indeed review the current laws.

=== 2010–2013 ===
In September 2012, the then Minister of State (Independent Charge) for Women and Child Development, Krishna Tirath proposed a bill that would make it mandatory for husbands to pay a salary to their wives. This move was criticised by men's rights groups and they sought Prime Minister Manmohan Singh's intervention in the matter.

In late 2012, Satyamev Jayate, an Indian TV show hosted by actor Aamir Khan, was criticized by men's rights activists. According to Anil Kumar, co-founder of SIFF, Khan had portrayed men negatively on the show and had projected only one side of the domestic violence issue. In December 2012, about 15,000 men pledged to boycott Khan's film Talaash. Phanisai Bhardwaj, a Lok Satta Party candidate in Karnataka assembly polls, was found out to be a member of Centre for Men's Rights, against the Section 498a of IPC and reservations in jobs or education, after he made a post on Facebook in April 2013. He faced a protest campaign against him on the blogosphere, which called the Lok Satta Party 'anti-women' and 'casteist.' Jayprakash Narayan, founder of Lok Satta Party, called Bhardwaj's position on women "unacceptable, and he was subsequently asked to withdraw his nomination. In August that same year, Hridaya, a Kolkata-based NGO raised concerns about the proposed Marriage Laws (Amendment Bill), 2010 which has been approved by the cabinet and cleared by Group of Ministers (GoM) headed by defence minister A. K. Antony. According to Amartya Talukdar, the bill, which introduces the concept of no-fault divorce and marital property is not fair for men. It will put the institution of marriage in jeopardy.

On 21 December 2013, members of National Coalition for Men held a demonstration outside the offices of West Bengal Human Rights Commission (WBHRC) in Kolkata, stating that former Supreme Court judge Asok Kumar Ganguly, and then chairman of WBHRC, was innocent until proven guilty. Ganguly had been accused of sexual harassment by a law intern. Amit Gupta, General Secretary of National Coalition for Men, said that even if the legal system of India and the UN Charter on Human Rights states that an accused is to be treated as innocent until proven guilty, Ganguly was being held as guilty and subjected to a media trial.

=== 2014 ===
On 16 February 2014, the members of Hridaya organised another protest against the Marriage Laws Amendment Bill (India) that would introduce no fault divorce in the Hindu Marriage Act by wearing saris. Amartya Talukdar voiced concern and said that if the government really intends to empower women, then the law should be made applicable to all communities by bringing uniform civil code instead of being applicable only to Hindus. In March 2014, men's rights activists also criticised the second season of Aamir Khan's TV show, Satyamev Jayate. SIFF said that the Aamir Khan quoted the domestic violence data from the National Family Health Survey, which surveyed only women from 15 to 49 age. They said the show gave the perception that men do not suffer from domestic violence.

In May 2014, Save Indian Family Foundation (SIFF) launched a mobile app called SIF One to reach out to men in distress. In the same month, an all India telephone helpline was launched.

==== Indian general election, 2014 ====
During the pre-election campaign period for the 2014 Indian general election, on 11 January 2014, National Coalition for Men in Kolkata present their demand of the formation of a men's ministry and a men's rights panel to all political parties in India. They also released their own manifesto called "Men-ifesto" which dealt with the issues of men and the need of provisions from the government to address those issues. The other demands raised were gender neutral laws, rehabilitation of men who were acquitted, speedy trials of the accused languishing in custody, and equal rights in child custody. The National Coalition for Men met with political parties across India to urge them to include men's rights in their manifestos. Amit Gupta said that they may start their own political party if their demands are ignored. On 28 March 2014, Amit Gupta urged voters across the country to exercise the "None of the above" (NOTA) in the 2014 general elections. According to him, no political party was paying heed to their demands of gender neutral laws and a Ministry of Men's Welfare.

In early April 2014, Save Indian Family Foundation (SIFF) sent out four queries regarding men's issues to various political leaders. Anil Kumar of SIFF said that they would decide which party to vote for in the 2014 election based on the responses. He added that a survey of SIFF members had indicated a lack of support for the Congress party and the Communist Party of India. The four questions that were posed are whether the party would introduce a bill to protect men against domestic violence, whether biological fathers should be given partial custody in a shared parenting arrangement in divorces, whether consensual sex with the false promise of marriage should be considered rape and if a man should be considered a rapist for breaking up with his girlfriend, and whether the party would introduce men studies courses in universities similar to other gender studies courses.

On 16 April 2014, men's right groups asked supporters to vote for Samajwadi Party or use "None of the above" (NOTA). Amit Lakhani, an activist of Save Family Foundation based in New Delhi, expressed support for Samajwadi Party by saying that only that political party had included men's issues in their manifesto.

=== 2015–present ===
In December 2015, the Mumbai-based Vaastav Foundation released a calendar called a "Malendar" marking male-oriented days such as Father's Day and International Men's Day. Amit Deshpande, the founder of Vaastav Foundation said that they were trying to raise awareness towards these days through positive images of men.

==== Mumbai Marathon ====
During the 2016 Mumbai Marathon, about 150 men from Vaastav Foundation participated dressed as ATMs. Deshpande commented, "A man is forced to be an ATM for his family and if he fails to protect his wife or provide for her, he is immediately accused of mistreating her." One of the placards visible during the event read "Until men learn to express their pain, every story will always portray women as victims." The participation with men dressed as ATM, the first of its kind, received coverage by the media worldwide.

Vaastav's participation in the 2017 Mumbai Marathon was grander with participation in larger numbers and with a big prop of a snake which they referred to it as the 'snake of misandry that gobbles up innocent men.' The larger-than-life snake had details about misused gender-discriminative criminal laws (namely anti-dowry laws, molestation, rape, section 377 of IPC and maintenance & alimony laws) on one side and the text of most concerning social & criminal issues faced by boys & men (viz. child-labor, boy's education, male suicides, domestic violence on men, male rape and patriarchal burdens of being default protectors & providers) on the other side. Now a new organization "Avijan Welfare And Charitable Trust" is working on men's rights in Kolkata. A magazine "Purush Kotha" is released on men's rights and problems faced by men.

While displaying banners with the text "Patriarchy Enslaves Men" and shouting slogans that meant "Would you marry? Would you go to prison?" the activists equated marriage with entrapment. Their participation was widely covered by regional & national print & electronic media.

In 2016, a documentary film called 'Martyrs of Marriage' was released by Mumbai-based filmmaker and activist Deepika Narayan Bharadwaj. The film, which features real-life stories of men suffering from abuse due to anti-dowry laws, including those that have committed suicide.

== Issues ==
=== Anti-dowry laws ===
==== The Laws ====
The men's rights activists claims that the anti-dowry laws are being frequently misused to harass and extort husbands. The high rate of suicide among married men in India is also attributed to harassment under these laws by the activists. The practice of giving dowry was first criminalised in 1961 under the Dowry Prohibition Act, 1961 and later the Section 498A of the Indian Penal Code was introduced in 1983. The Section 498A of the Indian Penal Code which deals with cruelty to a wife states that:

Whoever, being the husband or the relative of the husband of a woman, subjects such woman to cruelty shall be punished with imprisonment for a term which may extend to three years and shall also be liable to fine.

For the purposes of this section, "cruelty" means:
(a) any wilful conduct which is of such a nature as is likely to drive the woman to commit suicide or to cause grave injury or danger to life, limb or health (whether mental or physical) of the woman; or

(b) harassment of the woman where such harassment is with a view to coercing her or any person related to her to meet any unlawful demand for any property or valuable security or is on account of failure by her or any person related to her to meet such demand.

The Section 113b of the Indian Evidence Act, 1879 says that if a married woman committed suicide within seven years of marriage, it must be assumed by the court that her husband and his family abetted the suicide, especially if there was evidence of prior dowry demands.

Until July 2014, the Section 498a of the Indian Penal Code allowed the police to arrest the persons mentioned in the complaint without a warrant or without any investigation. The crime was non-bailable, so chances of getting a bail are low and husbands usually lost their jobs while in custody. On 2 July 2014, the Supreme Court of India in an order stopped automatic arrests under the Section 498a. The Court directed the police to use the Section 41 of the Code of Criminal Procedure, 1973, which contains a checklist, to decide whether an arrest is necessary. The Court also stated that in all arrests the magistrate must examine whether further detention was necessary. There is also no provision of withdrawing a complaint in case of a reconciliation. However, an amendment to rectify this has been proposed.

Of all arrests made the Indian Penal Code, 6% are made under the Section 498a. Of all crimes reported under the Indian Penal Code, 4.5% are filed under Section 498a, which is the highest barring theft and hurt. Of the cases that go to trial, only 15% result in conviction. In July 2014, 3,72,706 cases under Section 498a were pending in Indian courts.

==== Criticism of the laws ====
According to SIFF, these laws don't follow conventional legal premises where a person is innocent until proven guilty. It has also pointed out that several of those who are arrested under this law are women themselves, i.e., female relatives of husbands. Swarup Sarkar, a spokesperson of SIFF, has said that men with low incomes are rarely targeted and most victims of misuse are well-off. He has claimed that these laws assume that women are always truthful, and don't place much importance on evidence. An Indian court has termed misuse of these laws, legal terrorism.

Almost a quarter of people arrested under Section 498a are women, mostly mothers and sisters of the accused husband. In 2012, 47,951 women were arrested under this law. According to Ram Prakash Chugh, a large majority of the women in Tihar jail are there due to dowry charges. He has claimed that sometimes mothers of the bride bring dowry charges on their in-laws when the bride fails to adjust to her in-laws. Organisations like All India Mother-in-Law Protection Forum (AIMPF) and Mothers And Sisters of Husbands Against Abuse of Law (MASHAAL) have been formed to represent such women. Some non-resident Indians (NRI) groups have also demanded amendments to the anti-dowry law. Anindya Chatterjee, a California-based IT worker who runs an online support group, was accused under the law. He has said that sometimes while visiting India, men are accused under the law and get arrested by police without verifying if the case is genuine and their passports are seized. The cases often take a year to clear up, as a result the men lose their jobs abroad due to frequent travels to attend the court or being unable to leave India. Canada and United States have issued travel advisories warning of India's anti-dowry law misuses in the past.

Jyotsna Chatterjee, member of the Joint Women's Programme which was involved in drafting the Domestic Violence Act 2005, has responded to these criticism of the anti-dowry law, by stating that compared to the men who have faced the misuse of the anti-dowry law, many more women have suffered from dowry demands. She has said that there has been no change in the way society sees women and they are still treated as second-class citizens. Indira Jaising has also rejected the view that anti-dowry law and domestic violence laws are being misused. She has also claimed that the high acquittal under dowry cases occurs because prosecutions are conducted improperly and people are encouraged to settle out of court. Indrani Sinha of Sanlaap has said that the anti-dowry cannot be easily misused. She said that if the husband and his family are innocent then they should go to the police before the wife and file a complaint.

==== Notable verdicts and legal panel reports ====
- In November 2003, the Committee on Reforms in the Criminal Justice System (CRCJS), headed by V. S. Malimath, recommended that Section 498a be made bailable and compoundable.
- In July 2005, the Supreme Court admitted that in many instances complaints under the Section 498a of the Indian Penal Code are not bona fide and have oblique motives. The court added that acquittal in such cases doesn't erase the suffering the defendant has to go through, which is compounded by adverse media coverage. The court also directed the legislature to find ways to check such false cases.
- In August 2010, the Supreme Court directed the government to amend Section 498a of the Indian Penal Code in view of the rising numbers of false or exaggerated complaints against husbands and their relatives by women. It further added that such complaints result in the husband and his relatives remaining in custody until trial or bail, which kills all chances of an amicable settlement.
- In January 2012, the Law Commission of India recommended that Section 498a should be made a compoundable offense. But, the court will decide if the particular case is compoundable or not.

On 2 July 2014, the Supreme Court said that this law is being used by some women to harass their husband and in-laws. Through Arnesh Kumar Guidelines the court prohibited the police from making arrests on the mere basis of a complaint. The court asked the police to follow Section 41 of the Code of Criminal Procedure, 1973, which provides a 9-point checklist which must be used to decide the need for an arrest. The court also said that a magistrate must decide whether an arrested accused is needed to be kept under further detention. The decision was in response to a Special Leave Petition (SPL) filed by one Arnesh Kumar challenging his arrest and of his family under this law. The decision was welcomed by men's right activists but was criticised by women rights activists. However, due to lack of communication to police stations, the guidelines of Supreme Court of India are still not being followed.

Ranjana Kumari of the Centre for Social Research has criticised the Supreme Court's judgement which said that anti-dowry laws are being misused and stopped arrests based on FIRs. She said that if laws are being misused then the law enforcement should be held responsible. Recently. the Supreme Court of India has agreed to hear a Public Interest Litigation to set up a National Commission for Men in the light of rising suicide by married men in India whose years are lost in fighting false cases.

==== Proposed amendments ====
In 2014, the National Commission for Women proposed some changes to the law which included widening the definition of the term dowry and increasing the penalty for false cases. But, the suggestions were rejected by the Ministry of Women and Child Development. The Minister for Women, Maneka Gandhi, told the Lok Sabha in December, "The NCW had recommended certain amendments in Dowry Prohibition Act. However, the ministry has taken a considered view on the matter and decided to drop the amendment proposed by NCW in the present form after taking into account the comments of the high level committee on the status of women and the ministry of home affairs." Ranjana Kumari of Centre for Social Research welcomed this decision to not dilute the law.

In March 2015, it was reported that Government of India was planning to amend Section 498A. It would be made compoundable, which would allow the parties to settle if the court recommended it. The fine for filing a false case would be increased from ₹1,000 to ₹15,000. Amit Gupta, of National Coalition for Men, has opposed making the law compoundable. He has said that it would make extortion easier. He has pointed out that after Andhra Pradesh made it compoundable, the number of case rose by 150% and conviction rate fell by 400%. Maneka Gandhi, the Minister for Women & Child Development, has also opposed any changes to the existing dowry laws. Ranjana Kumari of the Centre for Social Research has also expressed disagreement over demands to amend the anti-dowry law, pointing out that dowry deaths are still occurring in India.

=== Divorce and child custody laws ===
The men's rights activists in India claim that the divorce and child custody laws are biased against men. They say that this allows divorced wives to stop men from seeing their children for long periods of time. They have said that alimony should not be granted if the wife is the primary earner of the family and the law should see men capable of bringing up children.

In India, child custody is granted to the father only if the mother is mentally unstable or has left home leaving behind the child. At present, the matter custody in case of divorce is governed by two laws: Guardians and Wards Act, 1890 and Hindu Minority and Guardianship Act, 1956. But, both laws do not have any provisions for shared parenting or joint custody. Under the Evidence Act, 1872, if a child is born within a marriage or within 280 days of dissolution of a marriage, then the child is considered legitimate and is entitled to child support and inheritance. At present, DNA paternity tests do not take precedence over this law. The courts may still choose to ignore the genetic evidence and ask a non-biological parent to pay for child support. An organisation named Children's Rights Initiative for Shared Parenting (CRISP) has demanded better child access laws and has called the current custodial laws gender-biased. It has demanded amendments to the Guardians and Wards Act be amended to make shared parenting mandatory. Only 25% of men involved in marital conflicts were allowed visitation rights by courts to see their children, which are frequently disregarded by the child's mother, according to a 2025 study by the Ekam Nyaay Foundation to examine the effects of parental alienation in India.

Swarup Sarkar of Save Family Foundation has speculated that now two out of three Indian couples actively share parenting. Kumar Jahagirdar, president of CRISP, has noted a growth in men who are the primary caregivers in the family.

==== Notable verdicts ====
In April 2003, the Supreme Court of India granted a woman divorce on the grounds of mental cruelty. She had claimed that her husband was harassing her and accusing her of affairs. Although four or five out of ten divorce cases in India allege mental agony, Ram Prakash Chugh said that if a man brought similar charges to a court, he will be unlikely to get a favourable ruling.

In September 2008, the Delhi High Court in a verdict said that a woman earning sufficient income is not entitled to maintenance from her divorced husband. The verdict came after a man challenged a family court's decision to grant ₹7,500 monthly alimony to his wife. The man had pointed out that his wife was earning ₹80,000 for month and had no other responsibilities. In September 2010, the Delhi High Court released a verdict that a man cannot be forced to pay alimony if he is unemployed. The man had challenged a lower court's order that he should pay ₹5,000 as alimony. The man pointed out that he was an expatiate working as a sales manager in Angola and had come to India to marry. He got married in May 2007 but the marriage lasted only three weeks. Due to his wife's complaint, the police seized his passport and he was unable to return to job, which resulted in his termination. The court stated that wife was equally qualified to her husband, and was working in a multi-national company, thus she cannot claim alimony.

In September 2010, the Delhi High Court said that a man's assets should be examined while deciding the alimony sum. The court was deciding a case where man initially asked to pay ₹15,000 in total as alimony per month by a lower. After an appeal from his wife, he was asked to pay ₹45,000 by another court which took into consideration his net assets. The man had challenged this decision by pointing out his monthly salary was ₹41,000. The court reduced the alimony sum to ₹20,000 per month and stated that a man's parents and sibling also have a stake in his assets. In October 2010, Supreme Court of India passed a judgment according to which long-term live-in relationships will be considered as marriage. The female spouse then can claim alimony under the Domestic Violence Act 2005 which uses the phrase "relationship in the nature of marriage." The court was adjudicating a case where a man, who was already married, was being sue by another woman.

In June 2012, Delhi High Court said that a woman who is educated and capable of maintaining herself, but has quit her job voluntarily is not entitle to alimony. The verdict was given in case where a woman challenged a lower court's decision to not grant her any alimony. The High Court pointed out that the woman was capable of earning ₹50,000 per month but was choosing to remain unemployed, and denied any alimony to her. However, the court ordered the husband to pay ₹10,000 towards child support. On 12 September 2013, the Karnataka High Court granted equal custody of a 12-year-old boy to both parents. The court ordered that the boy to remain with his mother from 1 July to 31 December of every year and to remain with his father from 1 January to 30 June, until the child reaches the age of maturity. Both the parents were also given visitations rights on Saturday and Sunday, when the child would be with the other parent. The child was also allowed to call or video chat with the other parent when in custody of one. The court also ordered both parents to bear the child's education and other expenses equally.

=== Proposed laws ===
==== Marriage Laws (Amendment) Bill, 2010 ====
In 2010, a proposed amendment to the Hindu Marriage Act would allow courts to decide compensation to wife and children from the husband's inherited and inheritable property. The bill has provisions for "irretrievable breakdown" of marriage where both parties must have lived apart for three years before filing for divorce. The bill would also allow the wife to oppose the dissolution of a marriage if it would leave her in financial hardship.

The SIFF protested against the 2010 amendment. According to Rajesh Vakharia, president of SIFF, this bill would encourage divorce and be costly to husbands, as they would have to part with their assets. He called the bill a regressive move, and stated that it jeopardizes the financial and social security of a man. He has pointed out that as most men marry after becoming financially secure, the possibility of losing their wealth and property would discourage men from marriage and feed the gynophobia in the society.

Kumar V. Jaghirdar, founder and president of the Bangalore-based Children's Rights Initiative for Shared Parenting (CRISP), said that alimony should be decided on the basis of how many years the couple were married, and argued that the law doesn't allow a husband to refute his wife's claims. He also argued that it is based on a flawed assumption that the children are always best cared for by their mother, and that it violates Article 14 of the Indian Constitution, right to equality. Swarup Sarkar, founder and member of Save Family Foundation, said that the suggestions offered by them to the Law Minister and the parliamentary committee were ignored.

Derek O'Brien, member of the All India Trinamool Congress political party, argued that this law empowers women at the expense of men. He proposed that this law should be made gender neutral by using the word "spouse" instead of "wife" or "husband." Arvind Kumar Singh of Samajwadi Party said that the law has potential for misuse like the anti-dowry laws and added that it treats men as being responsible for divorces. Vandana Chavan of Nationalist Congress Party has pointed out that the bill was unfair as nowadays, many women earn equal to or more than their husbands. Additionally, Amartya Talukdar raised concern that the bill amends marriage laws for Hindus only, who made up 79 percent of India's population in 2011. Talukdar stated, "If the Government really wants to bring about empowerment of women, let them make it open for all sections of the society. Let them bring a uniform civil code. Why is it only for the Hindus?" The Bill was passed by the Rajya Sabha in 2013. On 18 December 2014, Law Minister D. V. Sadananda Gowda in answer to a question told the parliament that the government has received complaints from men's rights group that the law will reduce the marriage rate in the country.

As of February 2015, the Bill has not been passed in the Lok Sabha.

==== Consultation Paper on Shared Parentage ====
In November 2014, the Law Commission of India started a study and released a consultation paper on its website seeking views from the public on proposed guidelines for joint custody and shared parenting. The commission expects to complete the study by January 2015 and present the findings to the government for amendments to the law by the 2015 budget session of the Parliament.

Flavia Agnes, an attorney and women's rights activist, opposed the shared parenthood law consultation paper floated by the Law Commission of India by claiming that it was being lobbied by men's rights organisations and that it would erode women and children's rights.

=== Domestic violence ===
According to men's rights activists, the incidence of domestic violence against men in recent years has increased. The activists say that many cases go unreported as men feel too ashamed to report abuse, or fear false accusations against them in reprisal. Two groups, the Save Indian Family Foundation (SIFF) and the Indian Social Awareness and Activism Forum (INSAAF), have demanded inclusion of men's issues in the National Family Health Survey (NFHS) conducted by the Ministry of Health and Family Welfare to allow a better picture of the situation to emerge.

Swarup Sarkar, founder of SIFF, has said that there is no legal provision for married men facing verbal or mental abuse. Indian Social Awareness and Activism Forum (INSAAF), and Confidare Research have drafted a bill which aims to protect men and boys from domestic violence from their spouses, girlfriends and parents. The draft is called the Saving Men from Intimate Terror Act (SMITA) and the groups aim to introduce it for debate in the parliament. The Protection of Women from Domestic Violence Act, 2005 identifies domestic violence as abuse or threat of abuse, whether physical, sexual, verbal, emotional or economic. It provides protection to wives and female live-in partners from domestic violence carried out by husbands, male live-in partners or their relatives. Swarup Sarkar of Save Indian Family has argued that Domestic Violence Act should be made gender neutral. He has also termed the law as legal terrorism.

Indira Jaising has argued that men don't need to be covered under the domestic violence act as they have several other rights to appeal with, but women need special rights to defend their lives in a male-dominated society. The Jabalpur, Amarkantak and Hoshangabad region of Madhya Pradesh reports a large number of sadhus who have left their marriages to become holy men or yogis. According to family counseling centres in Jabalpur, the share of harassed husbands was 70 percent among complainants as per data recorded between 2013 and 2014. About 4,500 husbands are missing from family court records in the region. A local stops the police from going after men who have left marriage and become sadhus.

More recently during the lockdown in India amid COVID-19, domestic violence against men has increased tremendously. As many as 1,774 men from 22 states across India reached out to the Save Indian Family (SIF) foundation in April 2020, alleging domestic violence by their spouse. Besides several incidences of groom burning have also been reported during lockdown across different parts of India.

=== Rape reporting laws ===
Between 2001 and 2012, the number of reported rape cases rose from 16,075 to 24,923, however the conviction rate fell from 40.8 percent to 24.2 percent Some men's rights activists point to the low conviction rates and claim that the lack of a penalty for falsely reporting rape has encouraged false cases.

=== Suicide ===
Marital Status of Suicide Victims in 2018
Marital status	Male	Female	Transgender
Unmarried	19987	10512	4
Married	64791	27742	0
Widowed/Widower	1257	1072	0
Divorced	520	423	0
Separated	559	288	2
Others	1792	884	4
Status not known	3208	1470	1
Total	92114	42391	11

According to the National Crime Records Bureau (NCRB) report in 2018, about 70% of all suicide victims were men, the same as the suicide demographics for married victims. Kumar V. Jahgirdar, president of Child Rights Initiative for Shared Parenting (CRISP), has attributed the suicides among married men on family stress.

Mithun Kumar, a researcher at SIFF, has said that police don't take any action even if the suicide note of a man states that he was tortured by his wife and in-laws, but in case of a woman's suicide her husband's family is taken into custody without investigation. However, in a 2012 report published by the Million Death Study researchers, it was stated that since attempting suicide in India was a crime until 2014, suicides are under-reported, especially suicides of young married women. Because in case of the suicide of a married women, usually the husband and his family are held responsible if the suicide has occurs within seven years of marriage. Sometimes suicides are mis-categorised as accident deaths.

=== Sexual harassment laws ===
The Sexual Harassment of Women at Workplace (Prevention, Prohibition and Redressal) Act, 2013 is not gender neutral and applies to the protection of women only. Rajesh Vakahria, a member of SIFF, has pointed out the bill was originally gender neutral until Ministry of Women and Child Development and some NGOs intervened and changed the name. He said that it was an outdated concept to consider that only women suffer from sexual harassment.

== Khasi tribe ==
The Khasi tribe in Meghalaya state is matrilineal. The children take the mother's surname, the sons have no rights to property, and a family without an heir usually adopts a girl. After marriage, a man moves into his wife's house. Their way of life is protected under the Khasi Social Custom of Lineage Act of 1997. In 1990, the men in this tribe started a men's liberation movement called Syngkhong Rympei Thymmai (Home Hearth Restructured). A previous movement started in the early 1960s died out due to lack of support. The current movement claims to have 2,000 members. According to them, due to a lack of responsibility or sense of purpose, boys are dropping out of schools, men are resorting to drugs and alcohol and dying before reaching middle age. The movement seeks, among other things, to have children take their fathers' names and to end the system of property inheritance that favours female offspring.

== See also ==
- Dowry law in India
- Save Indian Family Foundation
- Martyrs of Marriage, documentary on misuse of dowry law.
- Men's rights movement
- Nisha Sharma dowry case, acquittal in 2012.
- Violence against men
