= Deepika Narayan Bhardwaj =

Indian Equal Rights Activist

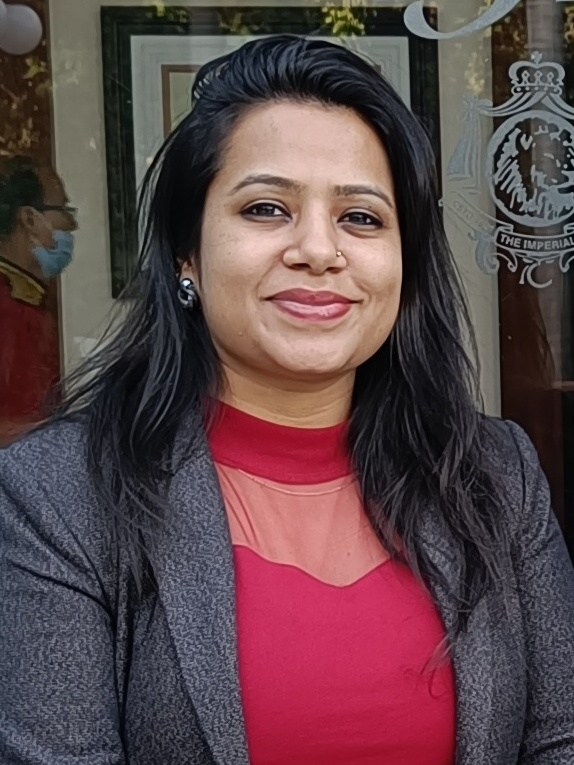
- Bhardwaj in 2022
- Born: 4 December 1986 (age 39); New Delhi, India
- Occupations: Journalist; film-maker; activist
- Known for: Men's rights, family rights, false case prevention during marriages
- Notable work: India's Sons

Deepika Narayan Bhardwaj is an Indian journalist, documentary film-maker and honey badger (men's rights activist). Bhardwaj rose to prominence after producing the documentary Martyrs of Marriage, which covered abuses of criminal section 498A (Anti-dowry law) by brides and their families. She also exposed a conspiracy of alleged victims in the Rohtak sisters viral video controversy by interviewing the witnesses and collecting proof. She has produced and directed the documentary India's Sons in 2021.

== Early career ==
Bhardwaj left a job in the information technology industry to pursue film-making. Her first documentary film Gramin Dak Sevak was a student film winner at Jeevika: Asia Livelihood Documentary Festival in 2009.

== Activism ==
=== 498-A and Martyrs of Marriage ===
Bhardwaj alleges to have been the victim of a false 498A case, after she and her cousin were charged under the provisions courtesy a police-complaint by her ex-sister-in-law; the issue was resolved in an off-court settlement involving a huge sum of money. This brought her into contacts with Save Indian Family Foundation, and she has since often collaborated with them in demanding an outright repeal of the law or amending to a gender-neutral version. Bhardwaj's personal episode also went on to serve as the motivations for making a documentary on the locus. Martyrs of Marriage (2017) narrated first-person tales of various victims who alleged of being at the receiving ends of abuse of 498A and interviewed politicians, judges et al. for their take on the issue.

=== False sexual harassment allegations ===
Bhardwaj campaigns against false sexual harassment allegations. She had supported the #Mentoo movement, a campaign that was started in response of false allegations of the #MeToo movement in India and wrote about how the me-too movement turned men into disposable or collateral damage. In the Rohtak sisters viral video controversy, she interviewed several witnesses and released videos that held the accusers of lying. In 2021, Bhardwaj played a proactive role in busting the case where a female student of Atma Ram College of B.A English named Ayushi Bhatia who had filed a series of sexual assault and rape cases to extort money.

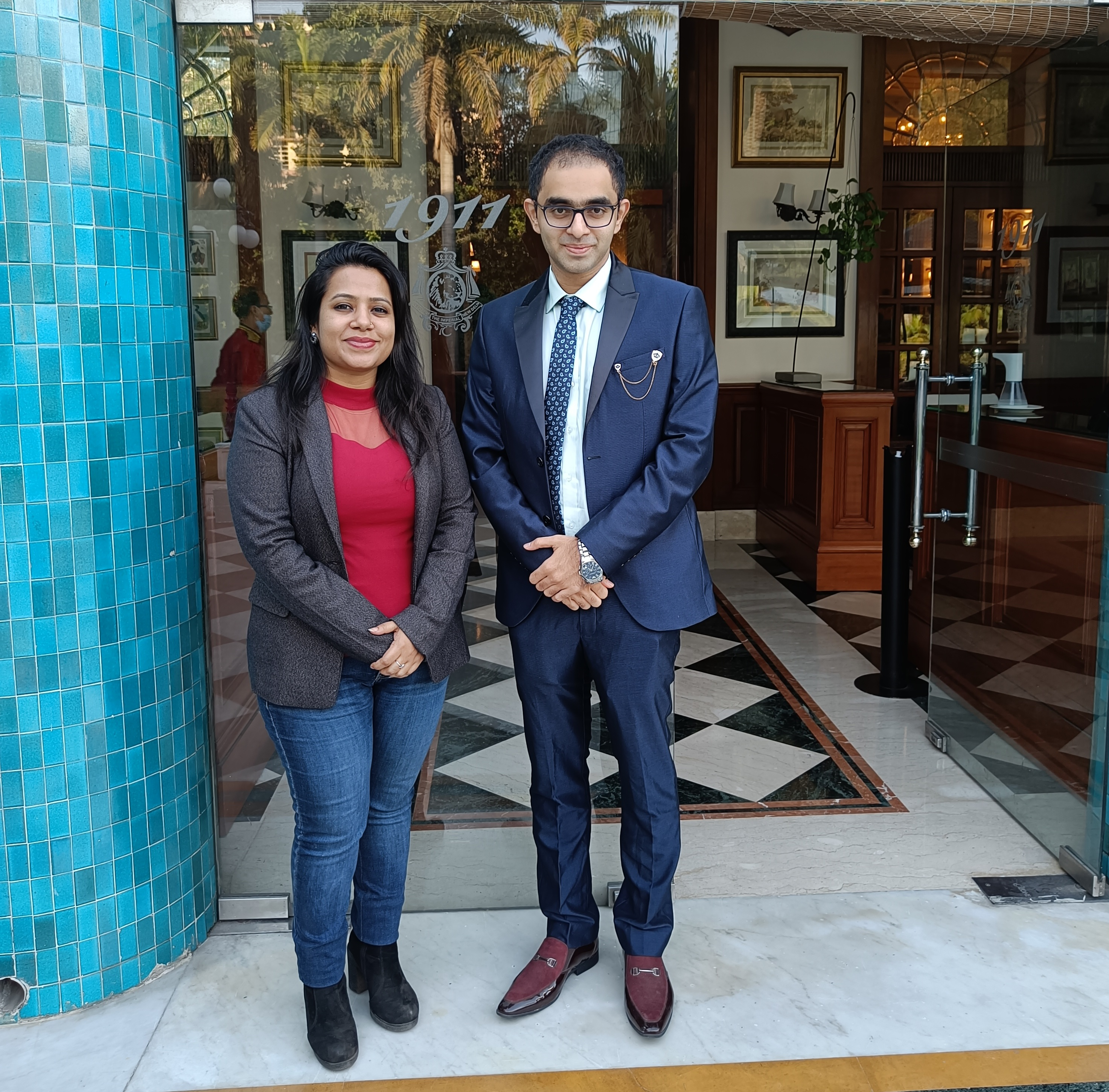
Deepika Bhardwaj with Dr. Edmond - global health physician at a meeting

=== National Commission for Men ===
Bhardwaj campaigns for the establishment of a National Commission for Men in India that would deal with men's issues including domestic violence and sexual assault.

=== India's Sons ===
In 2021, she produced another documentary called India's Sons, which focused on the condition of India's men due to false rape cases. She said that the documentary "inspired" men to tell their side of the story.

== Special Cases handled ==
Deepika rescued a minor from Gurgaon who was being assaulted and subjected to abject cruelty of all forms.

In an instance where a woman hired cab for over 12 hours then refused to pay Rs 2,000 in Gurgaon, Bhardwaj claimed the woman had previously harassed other drivers by doing the same thing and threatened to file molestation cases against them if the issue was raised.

== Filmography ==
=== Documentary ===
Year	Title	Notes
2016	Martyrs of Marriage	Netflix (2018–2020)
2022	India's Sons	

== See also ==
- Men's rights movement in India
