= MenToo movement =

Social men's movement

#MenToo is a social movement in India which was started against false sexual harassment allegations in MeToo movement in India. The movement was widely spread out after Bollywood actress Pooja Bedi and Founder of Purush Aayog Barkha Trehan appealed to bring gender neutral laws and investigation, after actor Karan Oberoi was arrested on 5 May 2019 due to a sexual harassment complaint filed against him by his ex-girlfriend.

== History ==
=== 2018 ===
A Bangalore-based NGO, Children's Rights Initiative for Shared Parenting (CRISP), started the #MenToo initiative in October 2018 in response to #MeToo movement. Protestors in Bengaluru said that their movement is against false cases registered under Section 498A of the Indian Penal Code, and added that their fight is also against the ordeal of children who are raised by single parents following a disturbing separation.

=== 2019 Karan Oberoi (singer) ===
Actor and singer Karan Oberoi was arrested on 5 May 2019, after a 34-year-old woman claimed that he had raped her on multiple occasions and had also extorted money and gifts from her. However, they were in a consensual relationship as per the affidavit filed by Karan Oberoi in court. Immediately after his arrest, his friend and Bollywood actress Pooja Bedi came in his support to bring gender neutral laws and investigation to launch the #MenToo movement. Australian social commentator Bettina Arndt has written a book with the same title.

=== 2022 (Johnny Depp) ===
In February 2019, actor Johnny Depp filed a defamation lawsuit against actress Amber Heard for $50 million over her allegedly defaming op-ed of him in The Washington Post. The case rose after Heard was found to have allegedly abused Depp while they were married; Heard fought these claims by claiming the other way around. On 11 April 2022, the official trial began. On 1 June, Depp and Heard were both found liable of defamation. Heard was obligated to pay approximately $10.35 million in damages. The case sparked the rise of the #MenToo movement outside of India.

== Protest ==
=== Twitter ===
Twitter users tweeted with #MenToo to show support with accused Karan Oberoi and protested against the unfair laws that target men. Twitter users were posting under the hashtag, claiming that these types of accusations cause suicide.

=== Bengaluru ===
In late 2018, amidst the #MeToo movement, Bengaluru based NGO CRISP had carried out protest in the city for demanding justice for the victims who have faced the consequences due to false cases registered under IPC section 498A, in addition to the ordeal of children who are raised by single parents following a separation.

=== Mumbai ===
Number of people from various fields, including actors and various men's right activists participated in the peaceful Dharna organised at Azad Maidan, Mumbai on 15 June 2019 to support #MenToo movement. Karan Oberoi and Pooja Bedi also participated in the protest.

== Views ==
Men Too movement has been applauded by men's rights activists. Prominent men's rights activists like KD Jha, Deepika Narayan Bhardwaj, Barkha Trehan etc. have argued that gender discrimination faced by men needs more attention.

Actress Tanushree Dutta, who had pioneered #MeToo movement India, called #MenToo movement ridiculous. She further said,

"You know, I can't help but laugh when I hear such ridiculous things such as #mentoo and it makes me angry that women in positions of public domain and influence will still stoop to massage the male ego to find their acceptance."

== See also ==
- Depp v. Heard
- False accusation of rape
- Hashtag activism
- Men's rights movement in India
