= Protection of Women from Domestic Violence Act, 2005 =

Indian Act of Parliament

Parliament of India
- Long title: An Act to provide for more effective protection of the rights of women guaranteed under the Constitution who are victims of violence of any kind occurring within the family and for matters connected therewith or incidental thereto.
- Citation: Act No. 43 of 2005
- Enacted by: Parliament of India
- Assented to: 13 September 2005
- Commenced: 26 October 2006
- Status: In force

The Protection of Women from Domestic Violence Act, 2005 (Note: Hindi: घरेलू हिंसा से महिला संरक्षण अधिनियम 2005) is an Act of the Parliament of India enacted to protect women from domestic violence. The law came into force on 26 October 2006. For the first time in Indian law, the Act defines "domestic violence", with the definition being broad and including not only physical violence, but also other forms of violence such as emotional, verbal, sexual and psychological abuse. It is a civil law meant primarily for protection orders, rather than criminal enforcement.

== Definitions ==
The Protection of Women from Domestic Violence Act, 2005 is different from the provisions of the Indian Penal Code in that it provides a broader definition of domestic violence in what it covers and who it protects.

Pursuant to the Act, the aggrieved person is defined as "any woman who is, or has been, in a domestic relationship with the respondent and who alleges to have been subjected to domestic violence by the respondent." This law protects not only women from violence within their husband-wife relationships, but women living in the same home with people with whom they are in a domestic relationship with. This protects women from violence within their relationships by marriage (ex: husband-wife, daughter-in-law with father-in-law/mother-in-law/etc), relationships by blood (ex: father-daughter, sister-brother), relationships by adoption (ex: adopted daughter-father), and even relationships in the nature of marriage (ex: live-in relationships, legally invalid marriages). This Act was considered to be the first piece of legislation to provide legal recognition and protection to relationships outside of marriage.

Domestic violence is defined by Section 3 of the Act as "any act, omission or commission or conduct of the respondent shall constitute domestic violence in case it:

1. harms or injures or endangers the health, safety, life, limb or well-being, whether mental or physical, of the aggrieved person or tends to do so and includes causing physical abuse, sexual abuse, verbal and emotional abuse and economic abuse; or
2. harasses, harms, injures or endangers the aggrieved person to coerce her or any other person related to her to meet any unlawful demand for any dowry or other property or valuable security; or
3. has the effect of threatening the aggrieved person or any person related to her by any conduct mentioned in clause (a) or clause (b); or
4. otherwise injures or causes harm, whether physical or mental, to the aggrieved person."

The Act includes and defines not only physical violence, but also other forms of violence such as emotional/verbal, sexual, and economic abuse through the section Chapter 1 - Preliminary.

== Scope ==
Primarily meant to provide protection to the wife or female live-in partner from domestic violence at the hands of the husband or male live-in partner or his relatives, the law also extends its protection to women living in a household such as sisters, widows or mothers. Domestic violence under the act includes actual abuse, whether physical, sexual, verbal, emotional or economic, or the threat of abuse. This definition also includes harassment by way of unlawful dowry demands to the woman or her relatives. Recently a District court in Mumbai has observed that Domestic Violence is not limited to mere physical injuries or abuse, but includes sexual, verbal, emotional and economical abuse Read more

== Options of aggrieved person ==
=== Rights ===
Pursuant to Chapter III of the Act, the aggrieved person has the right to:

1. "Apply for a protection order, an order for monetary relief, a custody order, a residence order, and/or a compensation order;
2. "Free legal services under the Legal Services Authorities Act, 1987;
3. "File a complaint under section 498A of the Indian Penal Code."

The aggrieved person also has the right to reside in the shared home regardless of whether or not she has any title or ownership over the home.

=== Shelter homes ===
The Act recognizes the aggrieved person's right to reside in the shared household; however, the Act also establishes the aggrieved person's right to reside in a shelter home as a form of relief. A Protection Officer or a service provider may also request this shelter on behalf of the aggrieved person. The Ministry of Women and Child Development in each State or Union Territory is required to recognize and notify of shelter homes available to aggrieved persons.

=== Medical facilities ===
Medical facilities are bound to provide free medical aid, even if the aggrieved woman requests aid without any prior recommendation either from the Protection Officer or the service provider. The obligations of the medical facility are independent of, and shall be fulfilled regardless of the fulfillment of, those of the Protection Officer and service provider.

== Implementation ==
According to Shalu Nigam, there are several gaps in the implementation of laws intended to protect women from domestic violence, including the 2005 Protection of Women Against Domestic Violence Act. Lack of awareness of the law, and therefore the accessibility and awareness of services, types of relief, and legal rights, prevents proper implementation of the law. Some of these implementation issues revolve around some districts, such as Odisha, giving these new regulation responsibilities to existing officers rather than employing new Protection Officers. This implementation gap results in duties pertaining to the Act being unfulfilled as PO responsibilities fall secondary to the officers' prior duties. Another barrier to the implementation of the law is the lack of meaningful immediate relief for survivors of domestic violence, such as "practical remedies in terms of medical aid, short-stay homes, creche facilities, psychological support, shelter homes or economic or material assistance", according to Shalu Nigam. In most districts, shelter homes are the only available form of immediate relief; survivors of domestic violence often also need "medical treatment, trauma counseling, clothes and ready cash, which are not provided in the shelter homes."

Beyond enforcement, implementation is also dependent on the slow-moving social acceptability of reporting these cases.

== Criticism ==
India's Committee on Reforms of Criminal Justice System wrote a report on offenses against women, in which the committee sought to expand the definition of "wife" to include women who lived with a man as his wife for a long period of time "during the subsistence of the first marriage". This specification implicated this expanded definition of "wife" refers to relationships between a woman and an already married man, rather than non-marital relationships. When Maharashtra attempted to follow the recommendations in the committee's report, the legal status of non-marital, live-in relationships was brought into public discussion.

The protection of women in non-marital live-in relationships in the same law applied to marital relationships was construed as an effort to legalize secondary marriages or non-marital live-in relationships. The committee's recommendations were in fact cited in a legal case, Chanmuniya vs Virendra Kumar Singh Kushwaha and Another (2010), to support an interpretation of the definition of "wife" to include relationships where a marriage is "presumed" due to a long period of cohabitation.

One criticism revolves around the law's lack of effective force in responding to the criminal act of domestic violence. As the law serves chiefly as a civil law, a further offense (such as violating a Protection Order issued under this law) is required before triggering criminal law sanctions against the respondent, such as arrest and imprisonment. However, groups involved in drafting the law believed this would provide more rapid and flexible relief for the victim.

Men's organizations such as the Save Indian Family Foundation have opposed the law, arguing that it might be misused by women during disputes.

Renuka Chowdhury, the Indian Minister for Women and Child Development, agreed in a Hindustan Times article that "an equal gender law would be ideal. But there is simply too much physical evidence to prove that it is mainly the woman who suffers at the hands of man".

Former Attorney General of India Soli Sorabjee has also criticized the broad definition of verbal abuse in the act. Global health expert & Director of Edward & Cynthia Institute of Public Health, Dr Edmond Fernandes has talked about how educated women use this as a tool of legal exploitation to harass men.

According to the then President of India, Pratibha Devisingh Patil, "Another disquieting trend has been that women themselves have not been innocent of abusing women. Some surveys have concluded that 90 percent of dowry complaints are false and were registered primarily to settle scores. It is unfortunate if laws meant to protect women get abused as instruments of oppression. The bottom-line therefore, is the fair invocation of legal provisions and their objective and honest implementation."

== See also ==
- Maternity Benefit (Amendment) Act, 2017
- Domestic violence in India
- Honor killing in India
- Dowry system in India
- Dowry death in India
- Bride burning
- Dowry system in India
- Sexual Harassment of Women at Workplace (Prevention, Prohibition and Redressal) Act, 2013
- Violence against women
- Prohibition of Child Marriage Act, 2006
