= Dowry death =

Femicide to extort more dowry

Dowry deaths are the murder of married women who are killed or driven to suicide following dowry disputes often after the bride has been severely harassed by the groom and his family. Dowry deaths are found predominantly in India, Pakistan, Nepal, Bangladesh, and Iran.

India reports the highest total number of dowry deaths worldwide annually. In 2023, over 6,100 dowry-related deaths in India were reported and over 15,000 cases were recorded. From 1999 to 2016, Female dowry deaths account for 40 to 50 percent of all female homicides recorded annually in India, representing a stable trend. Pakistan is predicted to have nearly 2000 dowry deaths occur every year.

Dowry deaths represent one manifestation of violence against women. Despite some countries banning the practice, it continues as a part of long-standing tradition. Countries in which dowry is a common practice tend to continue to practice arranged marriages. While the purpose of dowry is to provide stability for a newly married couple, the practice has morphed into a pressure on the bride’s family to give enough. This can mean families saving for their daughter’s dowry beginning at her birth, and even a desire from parents to not have a daughter, to the extent to which female infant neglect and abortion of female fetuses is more common. Additionally, the amount of dowry expected tends to be less the younger the daughter is, which can lead to daughters being married off at a younger age.

Dowry has no religious significance, and is practiced by Muslims, Christians, and Hindus across South Asia. Dowry differs from Mahr, an Islamic practice where the groom gives the bride property or money for her hand in marriage. Dowry death, and particularly bride burnings (a form of dowry murder/suicide), is relatively new phenomenon, not rooted in longstanding cultural practices, which has eroded the status of women.

== Discourse ==
The term “dowry death” has been criticized for improperly communicating the problem. People have argued against using the term dowry “death” as opposed to “murder” when discussing the topic due to the passive tone it uses to address this form of violence against women. Alternatively, others say there should be more of a focus on bride harassment by the groom and his family, as harassment is what comes before the murder/death of the bride.

Dowry death is also difficult to document as it is often the cumulation of many different interpersonal conflicts and pressures. When reporting statistics for dowry deaths, it is often separated from “domestic violence.” Scholars, particularly those working in western contexts, have emphasized the importance of making the connection between dowry deaths and domestic violence experienced by women across the world.

== India ==
Dowry deaths relate to a bride's suicide or killing committed by her husband and his family soon after the marriage because of their dissatisfaction with the dowry. It is typically the culmination of a series of prior domestic abuses by the husband's family. Most dowry deaths occur when the young woman, unable to bear the harassment and torture, dies by suicide. Most of these suicides are by hanging, poisoning or by fire. Dowry homicides are most commonly burning, drowning, and hanging/strangulation. Sometimes the woman is killed by being set on fire by her husband or inlaws; this is known as "bride burning", and is sometimes disguised as suicide or accident. Death by burning of Indian women has been more frequently attributed to dowry conflicts. In dowry deaths, the groom's family is the perpetrator of murder or suicide.

India has by far the highest number of dowry-related deaths in the world according to Indian National Crime Record Bureau. In 2012, 8,233 dowry death cases were reported across India. Dowry issues cause 1.4 deaths per year per 100,000 women in India.

According to a 1996 report by the Indian Police Service, every year it receives over 2,500 reports of bride-burning. The Indian National Crime Records Bureau (NCRB) reports that there were 8,331 dowry death cases registered in India in 2011. Incidents of dowry deaths during the year 2008 (8,172) have increased by 14.4 per cent over the 1998 level (7,146), while India's population grew at 17.6% over the 10-year period. The accuracy of these figures have received a great deal of scrutiny from critics who believe dowry deaths are consistently under-reported.

=== Prohibition ===
The Dowry Prohibition Act of 1961 prohibits the request, payment or acceptance of a dowry, "as consideration for the marriage", where "dowry" is defined as a gift demanded or given as a precondition for a marriage. Gifts given without a precondition are not considered dowry, and are legal. Asking or giving of dowry can be punished by an imprisonment of up to six months, or a fine of up to ₹5,000 (US$52, £39 or A$75). It replaced several pieces of anti-dowry legislation that had been enacted by various Indian states. Murder and suicide under compulsion are addressed by India's criminal penal code.

Indian women's rights activists campaigned for more than 40 years for laws to contain dowry deaths, such as the Dowry Prohibition Act 1961 and the more stringent Section 498a of Indian Penal Code (enacted in 1983). Under the Protection of Women from Domestic Violence Act 2005 (PWDVA), a woman can put a stop to the dowry harassment by approaching a domestic violence protection officer. After conducting field research, Shalu Nigam questioned the effectiveness of these laws, writing, "courts frequently ended up offering them compulsory counseling, which entails undesired results and narrow options," and noting "Laws could neither address the immediate needs of victims nor could offer practical remedies in terms of medical aid, short-stay homes, creche facilities, psychological support, shelter homes or economic or material assistance to the women which they need the most."

Although Indian laws against dowries have been in effect for decades, they have been largely criticised as being ineffective. The practice of dowry deaths and murders continues to take place unchecked in many parts of India and this has further added to the concerns of enforcement.

== Pakistan ==
In Pakistan, the giving and expectation of a dowry (called Jahez) is part of the culture, with over 95% of marriages in every region of Pakistan involving transfer of a dowry from the bride's family to a groom's family.

Dowry deaths have been rising in Pakistan for decades. Dowry-related violence and deaths have been widespread since Pakistan became an independent nation in 1947. Pakistan is predicted to have nearly 2,000 dowry-related deaths per year.

There is some controversy on the dowry death rates in Pakistan. Some publications suggest Pakistan officials do not record dowry deaths, and that the death rates are culturally under-reported and may be significantly higher. For example, Nasrullah reports total average annual stove burn rates of 33 per 100,000 women in Pakistan, of which 49% were intentional, or an average annual rate of about 16 per 100,000 women.

Pakistan's Dowry and Marriage Gifts (Restriction) Bill, 2008, restricts dowry to PKR 30,000 (~US$300) while the total value of bridal gifts is limited to PKR 50,000. The law made demands for a dowry by the groom's family illegal, as well as public display of dowry before or during the wedding. However, this and similar anti-dowry laws of 1967, 1976 and 1998, as well as Family Court Act of 1964 have proven to be unenforceable. Activists such as SACHET, Pakistan claim the police refuse to register and prosecute allegations of dowry-related domestic violence and fatal injuries.

== Nepal ==
Dowry is particularly common in the Terai region, constituting over half of Nepal’s population, and spanning areas of both India and Nepal. Although not as common as in other regions, dowry murders/deaths are one manifestation of what people have referred to as a femicide in Nepal. Undoing the dowry system continues to be a goal of organizations working to end violence against women in Nepal.

In 2009, dowry was banned in Nepal. However, there seems to be no enforcement of the ban.

== Bangladesh ==
In Bangladesh, dowry is called joutuk (Bengali: যৌতুক), and a significant cause of deaths as well. Between 0.6 and 2.8 brides per year per 100,000 women are reported to die because of dowry-related violence in recent years. The methods of death include suicides, fire and other forms of domestic violence. In 2013, Bangladesh reported 4,470 women were victims of dowry-related violence over a 10-month period, or dowry violence victimized about 7.2 brides per year per 100,000 women in Bangladesh.

== Iran ==
Dowry is an ancient custom of Persia, and locally called jahīzīeh. Dowry-related violence and deaths in Iran are reported in Iranian newspapers, some of which appear in English media. Kiani et al., in a 2014 study, report dowry deaths in Iran.

Iranian director Maryam Zahirimehr's 2018 film "Endless?" addresses trauma related to a dowry death in Iran.

== International efforts at eradication ==
Reports of incidents of dowry deaths have attracted public interest and sparked a global activist movement seeking to end the practice. Of this activist community, the United Nations (UN) has played a pivotal role in combating violence against women, including dowry deaths.

=== United Nations ===
The United Nations has been an advocate for women's rights since its inception in 1945, explicitly stating so in its Charter's Preamble, the Universal Declaration of Human Rights (adopted in 1948), the International Covenant on Civil and Political Rights (adopted in 1966), the International Covenant on Economic, Social and Cultural Rights (also adopted in 1966) (these three documents are known collectively as the International Bill of Rights) and the Convention on the Elimination of All Forms of Discrimination Against Women (CEDAW) (2012).

The United Nations Children's Fund (UNICEF), though predominately focused on improving the quality of education available to children globally, has also taken a proactive stance against dowry death. On March 9 (International Women's Day), 2009, at a press conference in Washington D.C., UNICEF's Executive Director, Ann M. Veneman, publicly condemned dowry deaths and the legislative systems which allow the culprits to go unpunished. In 2009, UNICEF launched its first Strategic Priority Action Plan for Gender Equality, which was followed by a second Action Plan in 2010. The aim of these plans has been to make gender equality a higher priority within all international UNICEF programs and functions.

=== Private organizations ===
Amnesty International, in an effort to educate the public, has cited dowry deaths as a major contributor to global violence against women. Also, in their annual human rights evaluations, Amnesty International criticizes India for the occurrences of dowry deaths as well as the impunity provided to its perpetrators.

Human Rights Watch has also criticized the Indian government for its inability to make any progress towards eliminating dowry deaths and its lackluster performance for bringing its perpetrators to justice in 2011. In 2004, the Global Fund for Women launched its "Now or Never" funding project. This campaign hopes to raise funds domestically and consequently finance the efforts of feminist organizations across the globe – including Indian women's rights activists. As of 2007 the Now or Never fund has raised and distributed about $7 million.

A relatively smaller organization, V-Day, has dedicated itself to ending violence against women. By arranging events such as plays, art shows, and workshops in communities and college campuses across the United States, V-Day raises funds and educates the public on topics of gender-based violence including dowry death. Full-length plays on dowry deaths include 'The Bride Who Would Not Burn'.

== See also ==
- Bride burning
- Domestic violence in India
- Dowry system in India
- Kerala snakebite murder
