= Swarup Sarkar =

Indian epidemiologist, public health professional and diplomat

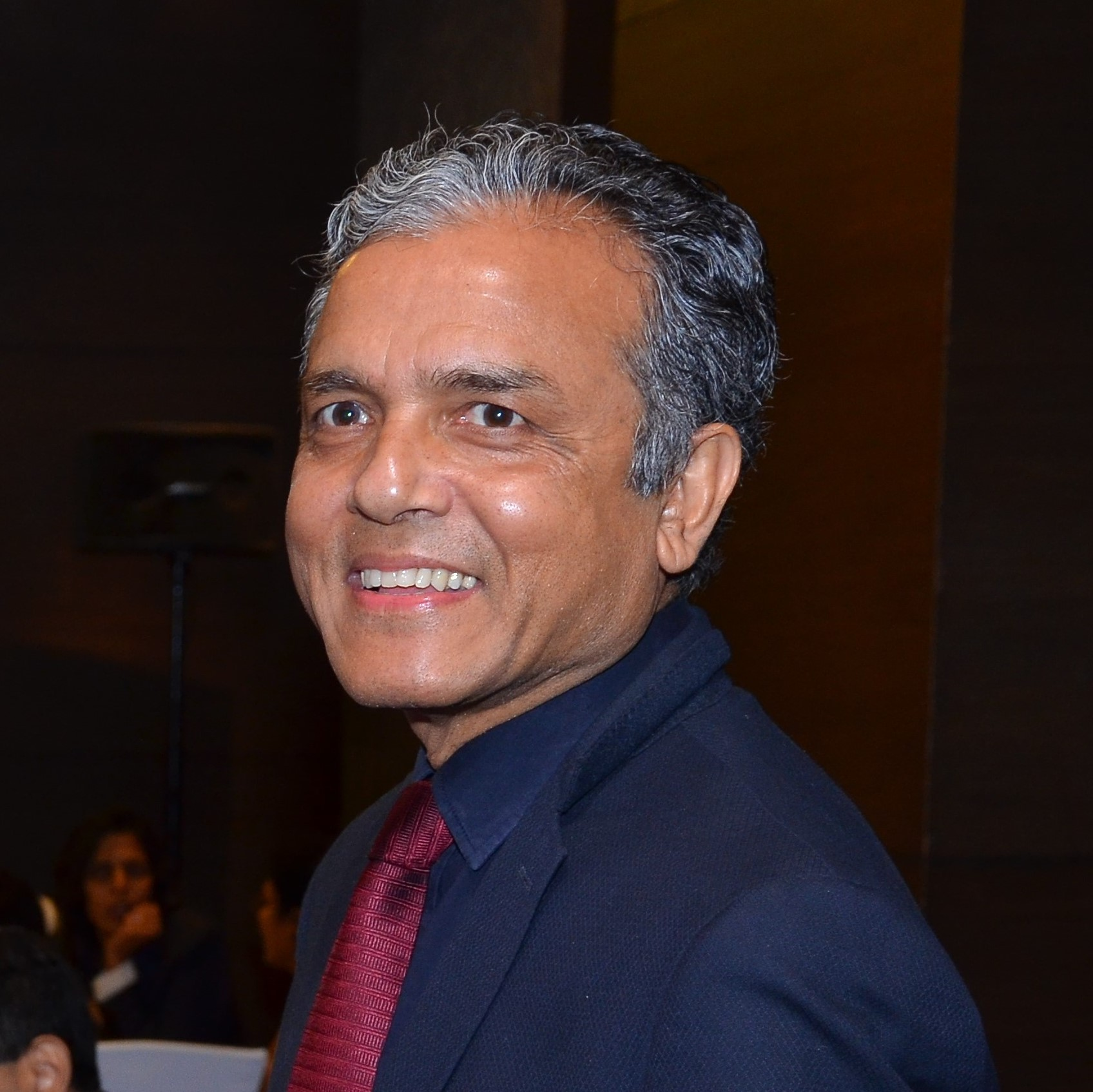
- Education: MBBS, MD, MS
- Alma mater: Medical College Kolkata Institute of Medical Sciences, Banaras Hindu University UCLA Fielding School of Public Health at the University of California, Los Angeles (UCLA)
- Occupations: Epidemiologist, public health professional and diplomat Past Director of Communicable Diseases, South East Asia Regional Office, WHO
- Employer(s): Indian Council of Medical Research, WHO, UNAIDS, Asian Development Bank, The Global Fund
- Known for: Public Health Advocacy for HIV/AIDS

Swarup Sarkar is an Indian epidemiologist, public health professional and diplomat known for his work in the field of Infectious Diseases and HIV/AIDS in particular.

He retired as the Director of Communicable diseases at the World Health Organization, South East Asia regional Office (WHO SEARO) in November 2018.<Sarkar has been awarded for his contribution in Public Health by World Health Organization (WHO) in 2018. Prior to his role in the WHO, he has served as the Head of South Asia and Regional Advisor of the Asia Pacific region of the UNAIDS and Director of Asia Pacific Country Programs of The Global Fund.

== Education ==
Sarkar was an alumnus of the AIDS International Research and Training Program from the UCLA Fielding School of Public Health, University of California, Los Angeles (UCLA).

== Professional career and contribution ==
Sarkar joined the Joint United Nations Programme on HIV/AIDS (UNAIDS) in 1998, and served UNAIDS at various roles for a decade, from being an Epidemiologist stationed in Geneva, to being the Team Leader of UNAIDS, South Asia and Regional Adviser to the Asia Pacific region.

Sarkar's UNAIDS group pushed South Asian countries to focus prevention services for the marginalized groups in ways which were not traditional in the field. He proposed and formed self-run services by the high risk communities and is recognized to create an enabling environment by breaking the barriers that obstruct people from accessing essential services. He has advocated for political commitment, acceptance of the HIV problem by the Governments, allocation of resources, mitigation of stigma associated with HIV/AIDS and an all-inclusive approach for target group identification, prevention and care.

Before returning to UNAIDS again in 2011, Sarkar worked with the Asian Development Bank and The Global Fund to Fight AIDS, TB and Malaria. In 2015, Sarkar joined the World Health Organization (WHO) as the Director of Communicable diseases for its South East Asian Regional Office (SEARO).

His works have shown that sex inequality and education for women and girls are strongly associated factors for HIV infection, emphasizing that the vulnerability of young women needs to be reduced by measures to improve access to schooling and education in sexuality and reproductive health.

Sarkar's main activities were centered around the reduction in stigma as a part of prevention interventions within activities meant to reduce transmission among sex workers, injection drug users, MSM and their partners. These activities, referred to as 'enablers', were required to create an enabling environment for these groups by removing barriers to access to services. These include the timing of services (for example, evening rather than daytime for sex workers), community ownership (for example, MSM, IDU or sex workers running their own clinics), removing disincentives caused by police harassment or violence and addressing other hindrances (for example, creches to look after children of sex workers while they attend clinics or those of IDUs in deaddiction services).

He has openly criticized the harassment of gay population, sex workers, and drug users, which were culturally widely common across the entire region of South East Asia. He established that fear of ill treatment by the health-care staff causes many HIV-infected women in the region not to disclose their HIV status, which has led to significant delay in care-seeking behavior of the infected mother and led to significant transmission of HIV infection to the new-borns.
