= Marriage Laws Amendment Bill =

Indian legislation

Parliament of India
- Enacted by: Parliament of India
- Bill citation: https://prsindia.org/billtrack/the-marriage-laws-amendment-bill-2010
- Status: Pending

The Marriage Laws Amendment Bill is a Bill that was first introduced in the Indian Parliament in 2010. It proposes changes to the Hindu Marriage Act, 1955 and Special Marriage Act, 1954. Both acts has a provision for divorce by mutual consensus of both the parties. The amendment of the marriage laws propose 'irretrievable breakdown' as an additional ground for seeking divorce. Under this provision any marriage party could file a petition for divorce. It grants a wife a share in her husband's inherited and inheritable property. But doesn't give Husband a share in any of his wife's property.
