= Save Indian Family Foundation =

Men's rights group in India

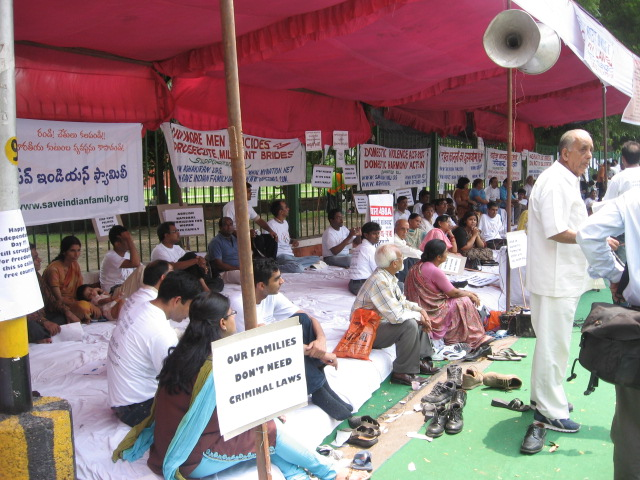
- Protest organized by Save Indian Families in New Delhi
- Formation: 2005; 21 years ago
- Type: Indian men's rights organization
- Location: Over 50 cities in 20 states
- Fields: Men's rights, domestic violence
- General Secretary: Rukma Chary
- Nagpur: Rajesh Vakharia
- Founders: Anil Kumar, Pandurang Katti
- Website: saveindianfamily.org, x.com/realsiff

Save Indian Family Foundation (SIFF) is a men's rights group in India. It is a registered, non-funded, non-profit, non-governmental organization (NGO) and works with various like-minded NGOs in India.

== History ==
Founded in 2005, SIFF is an advocacy group against what it calls misuse of Indian laws related to dowry harassment. It is an umbrella organisation of a number of men's and family rights organisations spanned across Indian cities and provinces. SIFF has supported the founding of other like-minded organisations, such as the "All India Mother in Laws Protection Forum" and "All India Men's Welfare Association".

In 2010, the group claimed on its website to have "30,000 members on the ground and over 3,500 on the internet who are fighting this legal terrorism with vigour and passion like commandos".

== Activities ==
SIFF created an app and a helpline for men, which got over 25,000 phone calls in four months.

The group campaigned against domestic violence legislation (such as Section 498a of the Indian Penal Code, (1983) and the Protection of Women Against Domestic Violence Act 2005), stating that these laws have been misused, and manipulated by Indian women. They assert that men are abused physically and are subject to legal, mental and social harassment by their wives because of these laws, and that lawyers and women use them to extort money and family property and to deny child custody to fathers. SIF members have sought to have the laws made gender neutral and be amended to include protection of men against abuse by women. The media comments that the organization is insensitive to high rates of domestic physical abuse committed against women in India In addition, they note the organization's use of 'strong language', including describing as "terrorist activity" the support given by women groups for the domestic violence legislation, and describing the women politicians who spearhead the legislation as “modern Surpanakhas”.

SIFF asserts that dowry harassment of women and their families is a figment of the feminist imagination, and that the woman is the abuser in almost all cases of family abuse. They campaign for decrimininalisation of anti-dowry offences, with the threat of imprisonment removed. In contrast, police and women's groups have denied the group's claims of widespread misuse of anti-dowry laws, stating that only a small minority abuse the law, and the approximately 7000 deaths of women every year who die due to dowry demands.

SIFF has also advocated for the creation of a Men's Commission in India. SIFF also protested against the 2010 Amendment to the Marriage Act.

SIFF also spoke out against a 2022 court petition which could criminalize marital rape, and sponsored a "marriage strike".

== Elections ==
SIFF ran an independent candidate, Satish Babu SN, in the 2018 Karnataka Legislative Assembly election from B.T.M Layout constituency; he finished 7th, gathering 333 votes (0.24% of the total valid votes).

== See also ==
- Patriarchy
- Antifeminism
- Feminism
- Dowry system in India
- Masculism
- Misandry
- Misogyny
- No-fault divorce
- Domestic violence against men
