= Dowry system in India =

The dowry system in India refers to the durable goods, cash, and real or movable property that the bride's family gives to the groom, his parents, and his relatives as a condition of the marriage. Dowry is called "दहेज" in Hindi and as جہیز in Urdu.

Traditionally, the dowry served as the inheritance for the daughter, as her relationship was seen as severed from her parents at the time of marriage, and is sometimes negotiated as consideration or a "status equalizer" between the marrying families, often as a means of upward mobility. However, the system can put great financial burden on the bride's family. In some cases, requests for a dowry has led to crimes against women, ranging from emotional abuse and injury to death.

== Historical context ==
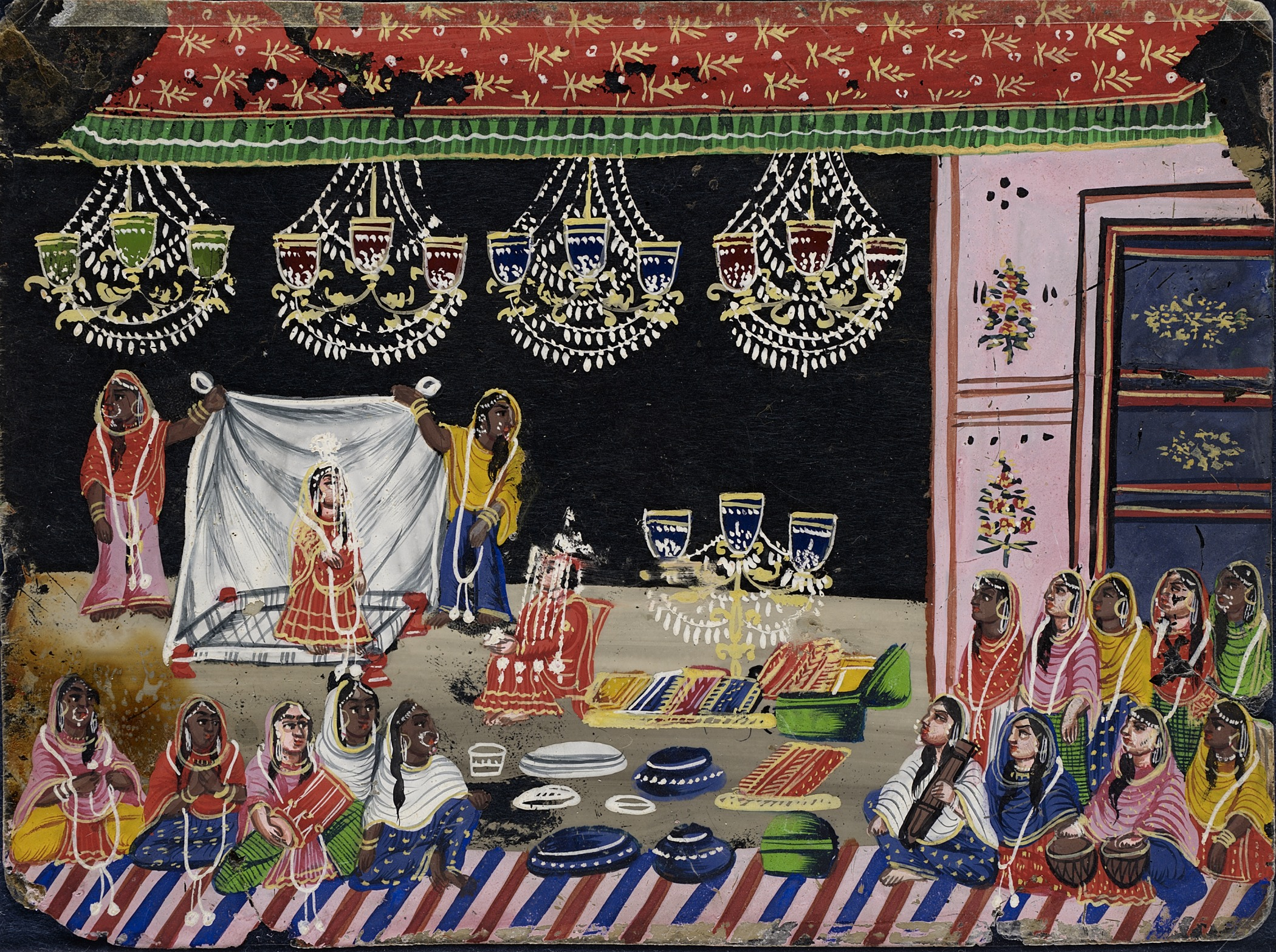
Wedding Procession - Bride Under a Canopy with Gifts. Circa 1800.

The history of dowry in South Asia is complex and not entirely clear. While some scholars believe dowry practices existed in ancient times, others disagree. Michael Witzel argues that ancient Indian literature suggests that dowry was not a significant practice during the Vedic period. He also notes that women in ancient India could inherit property, either by being appointed heirs or in cases where they had no brothers. Similarly, MacDonell and Keith support Witzel's view and differ from scholars such as Stanley Tambiah. They reference ancient Indian texts indicating that bridewealth—not dowry—was often paid by the groom, even in brahma and daiva types of marriage. Dowries were more common only in cases where the bride had a physical defect. According to MacDonell and Keith, women's property rights seem to have expanded during the Puranic period. Historian P.V. Kane, on the other hand, states that ancient texts suggest that bridewealth was specifically associated with the asura type of marriage—a form deemed inappropriate and condemned by Manu and other ancient lawgivers. Scholar James G. Lochtefeld adds that Manu's references to a bride's being "richly adorned" for marriage likely referred to ceremonial clothing, jewelry, and gifts that remained the bride's personal property, rather than a dowry demanded by the groom’s side. Lochtefeld also notes that such bridal adornment is not typically regarded as dowry today.

Supporting this interpretation, eyewitness accounts from the time of Alexander the Great's conquest of India around 300 BCE—particularly those by Arrian and Megasthenes—also report an absence of dowry practices. Arrian's first book says,

They (these ancient Indian people) make their marriages in accordance with this principle, for in selecting a bride they care nothing whether she has a dowry and a handsome fortune, but look only to her beauty and other advantages of the outward person.

— Arrian, The Invasion of India by Alexander the Great, 3rd Century BC

Arrian's second book similarly notes,

They (Indians) marry without either giving or taking dowries, but the women as soon as they are marriageable are brought forward by their fathers in public, to be selected by the victor in wrestling or boxing or running or someone who excels in any other manly exercise.

— ~ Arrian, Indika in Megasthenes and Arrian, 3rd Century BC

The two sources suggest dowry was absent, or infrequent enough to not be noticed by Arrian. About 1200 years after Arrian's visit, another scholar visited India, Abū Rayḥān al-Bīrūnī, also known as Al-Biruni, or Alberonius in Latin. Al-Biruni was a Muslim Persian scholar who lived in India for 16 years, from 1017 CE. He translated many Indian texts into Arabic, as well as wrote a memoir on Indian culture and life he observed. Al-Biruni claimed,

The implements of the wedding rejoicings are brought forward. No gift (dower or dowry) is settled between them. The man gives only a present to the wife, as he thinks fit, and a marriage gift in advance, which he has no right to claim back, but the (proposed) wife may give it back to him of her own will (if she does not want to marry).

— ~ Al-Biruni, Chapter on Matrimony in India, about 1035 AD

Al-Biruni further claims that a daughter, in 11th century India, had legal right to inherit from her father, but only a fourth part of that of her brother. The daughter took this inheritance with her when she married, claimed Al-Biruni, and she had no rights to income from her parents after her marriage or to any additional inheritance after her father's death. If her father died before her marriage, her guardian would first pay off her father's debt, then allocate a fourth of the remaining wealth to her upkeep until she was ready to marry, and then give the rest to her to take with her into her married life.

One notable historical incident involving dowry was the transfer of Bombay (now Mumbai) to the British Crown. This event was part of the marriage treaty between Charles II of England and Catherine of Braganza, daughter of King John IV of Portugal. The marriage treaty, signed on June 23, 1661, included the seven islands of Bombay as part of Catherine's dowry to Charles II. The official transfer of Bombay to the British occurred in 1665. The British East India Company took full control in 1668 after leasing it from the Crown for a nominal rent of £10 per year.

== Causes of dowry ==
Various reasons have been suggested as causes of dowry practice in India. These include economic factors and social factors.

Ethnologists Risley, Blunt, and Hutton explain dowry as a means upward mobility, or hypergamy. Among upper castes in India, marriages tend to be hypergamous, and thus, they explain dowry payments as a product of hypergamous marriages, in which family prestige is associated with marrying a daughter to someone within the higher social status.

Some suggestions point to economics and weak legal institutions on inheritance that place women at a disadvantage, with inheritances being left only to sons. This leaves women dependent upon their husbands and in-laws, who keep the dowry when she marries. Prior to 1956, including during the British Raj, daughters had no rights of inheritance to their family's wealth. In 1956, India gave equal legal status to daughters and sons among Hindu, Sikh, and Jain families, under the Hindu Succession Act (India grants its Muslim population Sharia-derived personal-status laws). Despite the new inheritance law, dowry has continued as a process whereby parental property is distributed to a daughter at her marriage by a social process, rather than after a parent's death, by a slow court-supervised process under the Hindu Succession Act (1956).

Dowry gave, at least in theory, women economic and financial security in their marriage in the form of movable goods. This helped prevent family wealth break-up and provided security to the bride at the same time. This system can also be used as a premortem inheritance, as once a woman is presented with movable gifts, she may be cut off from the family estate.

The structure and kinship of marriage in parts of India contributes to dowry. In the north, marriage usually follows a patrilocal (lives with husband's family) system, where the bride is a non-related member of the family. This system encourages dowry, perhaps due to the exclusion of the bride's family after marriage as a form of premortem inheritance for the bride. In the south, marriage is more often conducted within the bride's family, for example with close relatives or cross-cousins, and in closer physical distance to her family. In addition, brides may have the ability to inherit land, which makes her more valuable in the marriage, decreasing the chance of dowry over the bride price system.

In addition to marriage, customs that may influence dowry, social customs or rituals, and parents' expectations of dowry are important factors to consider. A 1995 study showed that while attitudes of people are changing about dowry, the custom prevails. In a 1980 study conducted by Rao, 75% of students responded that dowry was not important to marriage, but 40% of their parents likely expected a dowry.

While India has been making progress for women's rights, women continue to be in a subordinate status in their family. Women's education, income, and health are significant factors that play into the dowry system, and for how much control a woman has over her marriage.

Dowry in India is not limited to any specific religion. It is widespread among Indians. For example, Indian Muslims call dowry as jahez which has two categories: The first comprises some essential articles for the outfit of the bride as well as for conjugal life. The other is made up of valuable goods, clothes, jewelry, an amount of money for the groom's family, which is settled on after bargaining. The jahez is separate from cash payment as mahr, or dower, that Sharia religious law requires be gifted to the bride.

== Prevalence ==
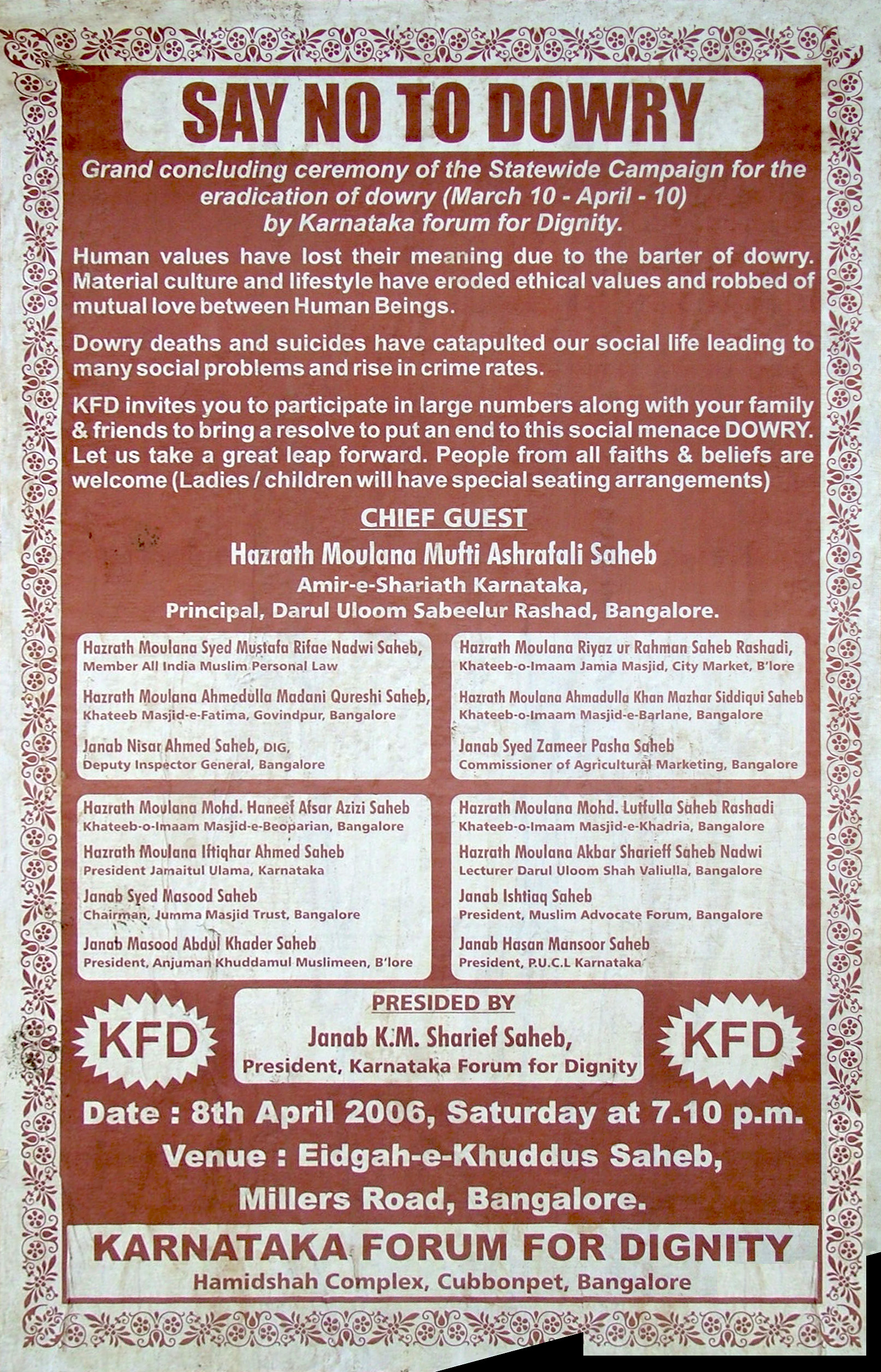
A social awareness campaign in India about dowries

Dowry had been a prevalent practice in India's modern era, and in this context it can be in the form of a payment of cash or gifts from the bride's family to the bridegroom's family upon marriage. There are variations on dowry prevalence based on geography and class. In states in the north, all classes are more likely to participate in the dowry system, and dowry is more likely to be in the form of material and movable goods. In the south, the bride price system is more prevalent, and is more often in the form of land, or other inheritance goods. This system is tied to the social structure of marriage, which keeps marriage within family relations.

Dowry also varies by economic strata in India. Upper-class families are more likely to engage in the dowry system than is the lower class. This could be in part due to upper-class women's economic exclusion from the labor market.

When dowry evolved in the Vedic period, it was essentially followed by the upper castes to benefit the bride, who was otherwise unable to inherit property under Hindu law. To counter this, the bride's family provided the groom with a dowry which would be registered in the bride's name. This dowry was seen as stridhan (Sanskrit: woman's property). Also, an important distinction is the fact that while the upper castes practised dowry, the lower castes practised bride-price to compensate her family for the loss of income.

In the modern era, the concept of dowry has evolved, and Indian families no longer practise bride price. This is because, with the passage of time, bride price gradually disappeared and dowry became the prevalent form of transfer. In the modern era, the practice of dowry requires the bride's family to transfer goods to the groom's family in consideration of the marriage.

Since marriages in India are a time for big celebrations, they tend to be very lavish. Accordingly, Indian weddings usually involve considerable expenditure and accompanying wedding presents from relatives of both sides of the family. This is normal expenditure which is done willingly and varies from one family to another, depending on the wealth, status, etc.

Many times, as part of this mutual "give-and-take", an attempt is made by the groom's family to dictate the quantum of each gift along with specific demands for dowry. In such circumstances, there is an element of exerting coercion on the bride's family, and this is what has come to be recognized as the "menace" of dowry. Dowry does not refer to the voluntary presents which are made to the bride and the groom; rather it is what is extracted from the bride or her parents.

== Types of dowry crimes ==
A newly married woman can be a target for dowry-related violence because she is tied economically and socially to her new husband. In some cases, dowry is used as a threat in a hostage-type situation, in order to extract more property from the bride's family. This can be seen in new brides, who are most vulnerable. Dowry crimes can occur with the threat or occurrence of violence, so that the bride's family is left with no choice but to give more dowry to protect their daughter. The northern and eastern states of India show higher rates of dowry-related violence.

Dowry is considered a major contributor towards observed violence against women in India. Some of these offences include physical violence, emotional abuse, and even murder of brides and young girls prior to marriage. The predominant types of dowry crimes relate to cruelty (which includes torture and harassment), domestic violence (including physical, emotional, and sexual assault), abetment to suicide, and dowry death (including bride burning and murder).

=== Fraud ===
A 2005 Canadian documentary film, Runaway Grooms, exposed the phenomenon of Indo-Canadian men taking advantage of the dowry system. These men would travel to India, ostensibly seeking a new bride, but then abandon the woman and return to Canada without her as soon as they had secured possession of her dowry.

=== Cruelty ===
Cruelty in the form of torture or harassment of a woman with the objective of forcing her to meet a demand for property or valuable security is a form of dowry crime. The cruelty could be in the form of verbal attacks or may be accompanied by beating or harassment in order to force the woman or her family to yield to dowry demands. In many instances, the cruelty may even force the woman to commit suicide, and such cruelty has been specifically criminalized by the anti-dowry laws in India.

=== Domestic violence ===
Domestic violence includes a broad spectrum of abusive and threatening behavior, which includes physical, emotional, economic, and sexual violence as well as intimidation, isolation, and coercion. There are laws, such as the Protection of Women from Domestic Violence Act, 2005, that help to reduce domestic violence and protect women's rights.

=== Abetment to suicide ===
Continuing abuse by the husband and his family, with threats of harm, could lead to a woman committing suicide. In such situations, the dowry crime even extends to abetment of suicide, which includes all acts and attempts to intentionally advise, encourage, or assist in committing suicide. The impact of dowry can leave a woman helpless and desperate, which can cumulate in emotional trauma and abuse. Dowry-related abuse causes emotional trauma, depression, and suicide. The offence of abetment to suicide is significant, because in many cases the accused persons often bring up a defense that the victim committed suicide at her own volition, even though this may not be true in reality.

=== Dowry murder ===
Dowry deaths and dowry murder relate to a bride's suicide or killing committed by her husband and his family after the marriage, because of their dissatisfaction with the dowry. It is typically the culmination of a series of prior domestic abuses by the husband's family. Most dowry deaths occur when the young woman, unable to bear the harassment and torture, commits suicide by hanging herself or consuming poison. Dowry deaths also include bride burning where brides are doused in kerosene and set ablaze by the husband or his family.

== Legal prohibitions ==
The first all-India legislative enactment relating to dowry to be put on the statute book was the Dowry Prohibition Act, 1961, and this legislation came into force from 1 July 1961.

Although Indian laws against dowry have been in effect for decades, they have been largely criticised as being ineffective. The practice of dowry deaths and murders continues to take place unchecked in many parts of India, which has further added to the concerns of enforcement. Section 498A of the Indian Penal Code required the groom and his family to be automatically arrested if a wife complains of dowry harassment. The law was widely abused, and in 2014 the Supreme Court ruled that arrests cannot be made without a magistrate's approval.

In response to increasing dowry-related crimes, the Indian government introduced several legal provisions, including Section 498A of the Indian Penal Code (IPC) and Section 198A of the Code of Criminal Procedure (CrPC) in 1983, followed by the Protection of Women from Domestic Violence Act in 2005, to enhance legal protection for women. Despite these reforms, which also included the introduction of Section 304B to specifically address dowry deaths, the effectiveness of these measures has been widely criticized.

The government also added section 113B to the Indian Evidence Act, 1872, and Section 304B was added to the Indian Penal Code, which created the presumption that if a woman was subject to a demand of dowry before her untimely death, the husband and his family would be presumed to have caused said death.

The Protection of Women from Domestic Violence Act, 2005, was also passed to further legislate dowries in the country.

== Criticisms of the dowry laws ==
=== Misuse ===
There is growing criticism that the dowry laws are often being misused, particularly the section 498A of the Indian Penal Code which is observed by many in India as being prone to misuse because of arbitrary arrests by the police. According to the National Crime Records Bureau statistics, in 2012 nearly 200,000 people including 47,951 women, were arrested in regard to dowry offences. However, only 15% of the accused were convicted.

In many cases under 498A, huge amounts of dowry are claimed without any valid reasoning. A rickshaw puller's wife can allege that she gave crores of rupees as dowry; and since it is a cognizable case, police are bound to register the case. In most cases, the financial capacity of the wife or her parents and the source of the funds are never tracked.

In 2005, Section 498A was upheld by the Supreme Court of India after being challenged. In 2010, the Supreme Court spoke about the misuse of anti-dowry laws in Preeti Gupta & Another v. State of Jharkhand & Another and more detailed investigations were recommended. Following the observations of the Supreme Court, the Indian parliament set up a committee headed by Bhagat Singh Koshyari. In July 2014, in the case of Arnesh Kumar v. State of Bihar & Anr., a two-judge bench of the Supreme Court reviewed the enforcement of section 41(1)(A) of the Code of Criminal Procedure (India) (CrPC) which instructs the state to follow certain procedures before arrest, and went on to observe that Section 498A had become a powerful weapon in the hands of disgruntled wives where innocent people were arrested without any evidence due to the non-bailable and cognizable nature of the law. The decision received criticism from feminists because it weakened the negotiating power of women. Others welcomed the decision as landmark judgment to uphold the human rights of innocent people. An organization called the Save Indian Family Foundation was founded to combat abuses of Section 498A.

On 19 April 2015, the Indian government sought to introduce a bill to amend Section 498A IPC based on the suggestions of the Law Commission and the Justice Malimath committee on reforms of criminal justice. News reports indicated that the proposed amendment would make the offence compoundable and this would facilitate couples to settle their disputes.

==== Nisha Sharma Lawsuit ====
The Nisha Sharma dowry case was an anti-dowry lawsuit in India. It began in 2003 when Nisha Sharma accused her prospective groom, Munish Dalal, of demanding dowry. The case got much coverage from Indian and international media. Nisha was portrayed as a youth icon and a role model for other women. However, it was later found that Nisha had fabricated the charges in an effort to avoid marrying her fiancé, and in 2012 all the accused were acquitted.

==== Atul Subhash Suicide ====
On December 9, 2024, Atul Subhash, a 34-year-old software engineer, was found dead at his residence in Bengaluru, India. He had died by suicide, leaving behind a 24-page suicide note and an 81-minute video detailing his grievances. In his final communications, Subhash attributed his distress to marital issues and ongoing divorce proceedings, naming his estranged wife, Nikita Singhania, her mother, and her brother as sources of his suffering. He also made allegations against Judge Rita Kaushik of Jaunpur Family Court, claiming she had demanded a bribe to settle his case.

The incident gained significant attention on social media, sparking public outrage and debates about men's rights and India's laws regarding dowry and domestic violence. Shortly after Subhash's death, his wife, mother-in-law, and brother-in-law were arrested and remanded to 14 days in judicial custody. The accused parties have denied the allegations.

The case has highlighted concerns about mental health support and the handling of domestic disputes in India, particularly those involving male victims. It has also led to calls for reform in the legal system and increased awareness of the challenges faced by men in marital conflicts.

=== Ineffectiveness ===
Although Indian laws against dowry were drafted decades ago, they have been largely criticised as being ineffective. Despite the Indian government's efforts, the practice of dowry deaths and murders continues unchecked in many parts of India, and this has further added to the problems of enforcement. There is criticism by women's groups that India's dowry harassment laws are ineffective because the statutes are too vague, the police and the courts do not enforce the laws, and social mores keep women subservient and docile, giving them a subordinate status in the society. The law ignores the complexities of dowry-related violence and overlooks the element of coercion, and arbitrary demands.

Furthermore, many women are afraid to implicate their husbands in a dowry crime simply because Indian society is viewed as having conditioned women to expect abuse and to endure it. While the laws give them the power, they are not effectively enforced by the police or by courts. It can take up to 10 years for a case to go to court, and, once in court, husbands and in-laws get away with extortion, or even murder, because the women and their families cannot prove "beyond reasonable doubt" that they are the victims of such crimes, as there are rarely any outside witnesses.

In a recent landmark judgment on dowry death, the Supreme Court of India held that "Mere death of the deceased being unnatural in the matrimonial home within seven years of marriage will not be sufficient to convict the accused under Section 304B and 498A IPC".

== See also ==
- Bride burning
- Domestic violence in India
- Dowry death
- Atul Subhash

General:

- Women in India
- Weddings in India
- Bride price
- Female foeticide in India
- Social issues in India

India-related:

- Domestic violence in India
- Female foeticide in India
- Gender inequality in India
- Gender pay gap in India
- Kerala snakebite murder
- Men's rights movement in India
- National Commission for Women
- Rape in India
- Welfare schemes for women in India
- Women in agriculture in India
- Women in India
- Women in Indian Armed Forces
- Women's Reservation Bill
- Women's suffrage in India
