= Harana (elopement) =

Sanskrit term for elopement

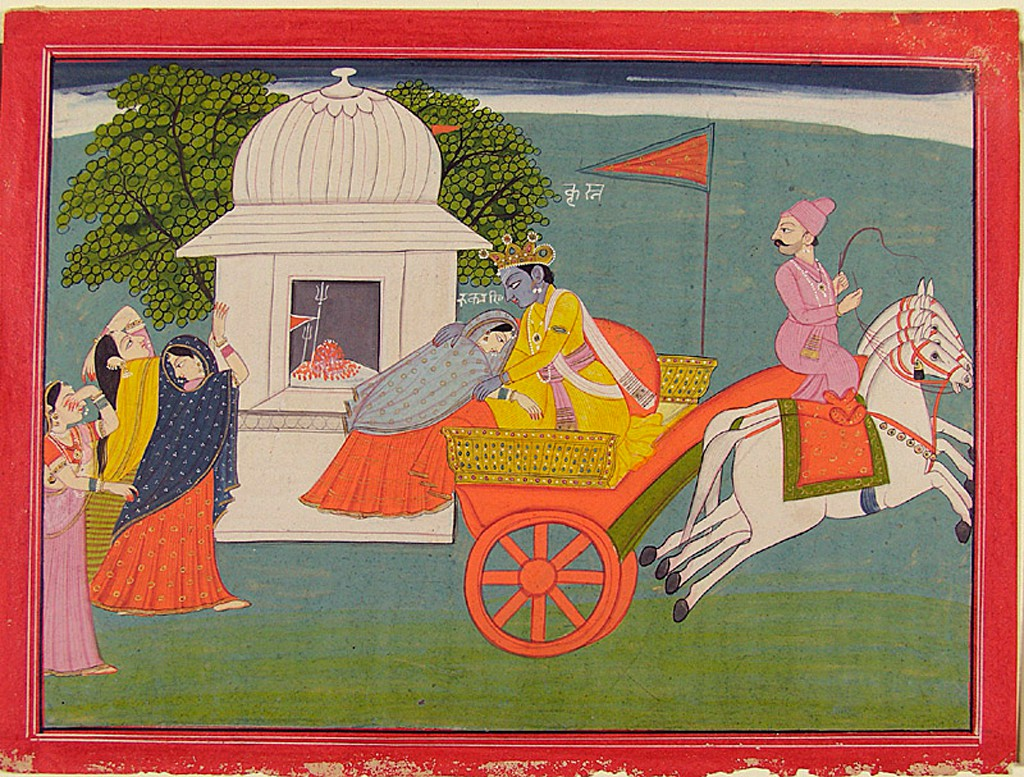
Folio of the Rukmini harana, the elopement of Rukmini with Krishna at the Ambika temple

Harana (Sanskrit: हरण, romanized: Haraṇa) is a Sanskrit term literally meaning seizure, commonly used to denote elopement. Elopement is a common theme featured in Hindu literature, with a number of characters choosing to perform elopement before their marriage, or being abducted by others against their will.

In historical Hindu marriage, the harana was present in the gandharva marriage, where a man and woman eloped without the performance of rituals or seeking consent from their parents, as well as in the rakshasa marriage, where a man forcibly abducted a maiden after killing her kin, after which she consented to marry him.

== Hinduism ==
=== Subhadra harana ===
The Mahabharata, and later texts such as the Bhagavata Purana, include the narrative of the Subhadra harana, the elopement of Arjuna and Subhadra. Engaged to Duryodhana and their impending wedding fixed by Balarama, Arjuna grows infatuated by Subhadra. After he realises that she returned his feelings, he carries her away on his chariot and weds her.

=== Rukmini harana ===
The legend of Rukmini's elopement with Krishna is called the Rukmini harana, the subject of many plays and texts composed in several Indian languages. In this legend from the Bhagavata Purana, Rukmini sends a letter to Krishna with a Brahmin messenger, beseeching the deity to save her from her marriage to Shishupala. Krishna elopes with the princess during her svayamvara ceremony, making her his chief consort.

=== Sita harana ===
The abduction of Sita, the consort of Rama, by Ravana, is a major plot in the Ramayana. In the epic, Ravana sends a rakshasa called Maricha to take the form of a golden deer to the forest where Rama and Sita stayed in exile. While Rama attempts to capture the deer at his wife's insistence, Ravana abducts Sita and takes her to Lanka.

=== Draupadi harana ===
The abduction of Draupadi by Jayadratha in the Mahabharata is called the Draupadi harana, set in the forest of Kamyaka. Besotted with Draupadi after observing her beauty outside the hermitage of the Pandavas, he asks her to abandon her husbands and marry him instead. When she refuses his advances, he forcibly carries her away on his chariot.

=== Parijata harana ===
The episode of parijata harana details the story of Krishna and his wife Satyabhama capturing the parijata tree from Indra and the dikpalas, featured in the Bhagavata Purana.

== See also ==
- Gandharva marriage
- Rakshasa marriage
