= Svayamvara =

Practice in ancient India

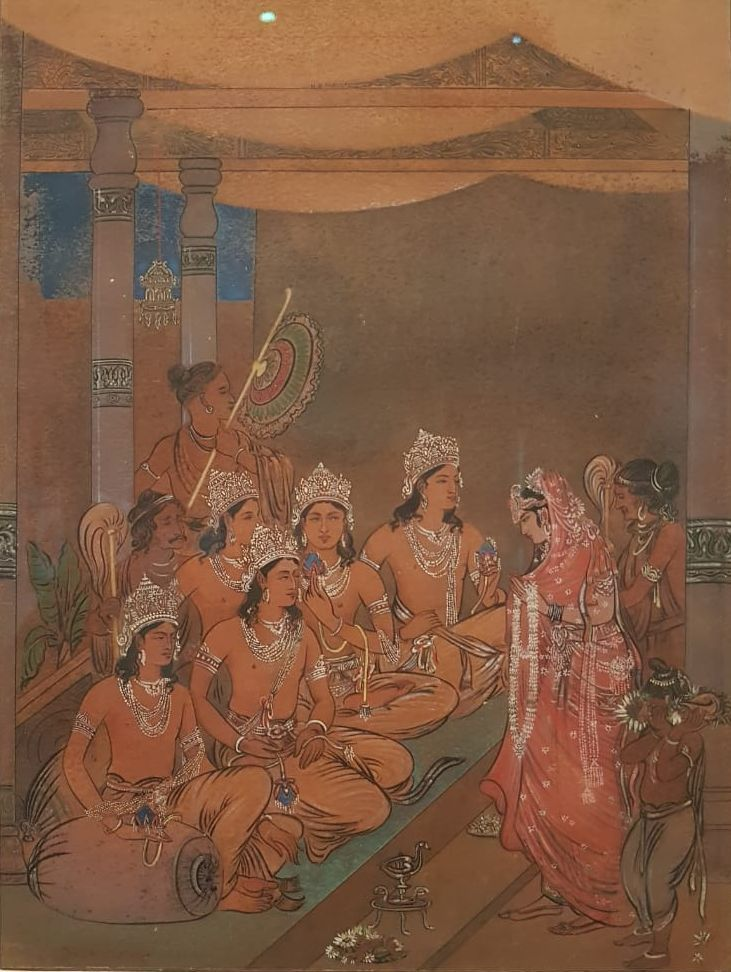
The Svayaṃvara ceremony of princess Damayantī, by Nandalal Bose

Svayaṃvara (Sanskrit: स्वयंवर lit. 'self-choice') is a matrimonial tradition in ancient Hindu society where a bride, usually from Kṣatriya (warrior) caste, selects her husband from a group of assembled suitors either by her own choice or a public contest between her suitors. This practice is featured in the two major Sanskrit Itihasas (epics), the Mahābhārata and the Rāmāyaṇa, though its prevalence and portrayal vary significantly between them.

The origins of Svayaṃvara can be traced back to the Vedic period and some scholars suggest that it emerged from the Gāndharva marriage tradition, diverging from more ritualistic and arranged forms of marriage, and developed as a narrative device within the epics to highlight the heroism and valor of protagonists, aligning with the Kṣatriya ethos of competition and martial prowess. Despite being closely associated with the epics, Svayaṃvara is not listed as a form of marriage in the Dharmaśāstra, a collection of Sanskrit texts on law and conduct. Due to this, Svayaṃvara is sometimes regarded as the ninth form of Hindu marriage.

== Name ==
The term Svayaṃvara is derived from Sanskrit, where it is composed of two parts: "svayam" (स्वयम्) meaning "self" and "vara" (वर) meaning "choice" or "desire." Therefore, the term literally translates to "self-choice".

The term "Svayaṃvara" specifically refers to the formal ceremony of selecting a groom in the Sanskrit epics. It's important to note that in certain significant instances where the bride chooses a husband independently, without a formal ceremony, the term "Svayaṃvara" is not used—such as in the case of Sāvitrī choosing Satyavan. The term appears 52 times in the Mahābhārata and only 6 times in the Rāmāyaṇa. The term is predominantly used in the Ādiparvan of the Mahābhārata and the Araṇyakāṇḍa of the Rāmāyaṇa, both of which experienced substantial expansion during the later epic phase. Thus, according to John L Brockington, "the term seems to belong not so much to the earliest, heroic phase of the epics' development as to the next, more aesthetically and even romantically motivated phase and in fact to have become much less common by the next phase again (that of the Śānti and Anusāsana parvans of the Mahābhārata and the Bāla and Uttara kāṇḍas of the Rāmāyaṇa), with its more moral and religious emphasis".

== Origins and development ==
The origins of the Svayaṃvara are somewhat ambiguous, with scholars tracing the practice back to the early Vedic period (c. 1500–1100 BCE). Historian Hanns-Peter Schmidt suggests that its origins may lie in ancient Indic customs with parallels in Indo-European tradition, as seen in Zoroastrian Iran. In support of this, linguist Stephanie W. Jamison notes several indirect references to Svayaṃvara in the Ṛg Veda, the oldest Hindu scripture, and suggests that the custom may have roots in the Indo-European tradition due to its similarity to the tale of Penelope and her many suitors in the Greek poem Odyssey. Alternatively, scholar Heramba Chatterjee Shashtri posits that Svayaṃvara possibly emerged from the Gāndharva form of marriage prevalent in ancient India. The Gāndharva marriage, which was based on mutual consent and romantic choice, might have provided the conceptual foundation for the Svayaṃvara. This contrasts with other forms of marriage prevalent in ancient India, such as Arranged Marriage or Sacrificial Marriage. Shashtri further proposes that the development of svayaṃvaras unfolded in three phases—an early form akin to the gāndharva marriage, a second form endorsed by the Dharmashastras, and a third form which, aligning with the societal ideals of the kṣatriya class, saw the svayaṃvara evolve into a competitive event, where the bride's choice was frequently influenced by a contest of skill or valour among suitors. Brockington adds a subsequent phase that developed after the contest style, placing greater emphasis on the bride's agency and romantic ideals, as well as Dharmashastra's ordinance to marry.

The Sanskrit Dharmashastras, the law books of Hinduism, such as the Manusmṛti (c. 1st century CE), permit a girl to choose her own husband if her father fails to arrange her marriage within three years after her first menses. Although this is very different from the ritualised and grand customs termed as "Svayaṃvaras," many scholars consider it as a sub-type of the custom, granted to girls of all castes. Jamison finds the allowance for a girl to choose her husband in the Manusmṛti to be a significant contradiction within a legal code otherwise intent on enforcing female dependence, and raises the question of why such independence would be granted under a system aimed at preserving women’s dependence. Professor Arti Dhand clarifies this question through the concepts of pravṛtti dharma and nivṛtti dharma. In this framework, pravṛtti dharma encourages active participation in worldly life, placing high importance on the procreative potential of men and women. As Dhand explains, pravṛtti dharma seeks to maximise the reproductive capacity of individuals, revealing a driving logic behind the svayaṃvara: a practical emphasis on ensuring women’s marital and reproductive roles are fulfilled, particularly when their parents have neglected to arrange a timely marriage.

Many scholars, though accepting its existence in the Vedas, state that actual historical records of Svayaṃvara customs are rare, and they contend that by the early Common Era it functioned more as a literary device in the epics than as a commonly practiced tradition. In the epic narratives of the Mahābhārata and Rāmāyaṇa (c. 500 BCE–500 CE), the Svayaṃvara is depicted as a knightly, splendid, and festive ceremony, which, according to Indologist Edward W. Hopkins, is not an evolution from an earlier concept of self-choice granted to women, but rather a distinct form that developed during the epic period of Hinduism, possibly having Indo-European roots. Hopkins also believes that the svayaṃvara may have supplanted an earlier kṣatriya practice of bride abduction, a custom that could occur with or without the bride’s consent. According to Hartmut Scharfe, if the epic svayaṃvara reflects an authentic tradition among kṣatriyas, it may have served as a mechanism for alleviating political pressures associated with marriage alliances. In a social class where marriages were commonly arranged to secure political alliances, often with limited consideration for the preferences of the bride, the svayaṃvara allowed the woman a degree of autonomy in choosing her husband. Alternatively, she might yield to the outcome of a skill-based competition, which relieved her father of the responsibility of choosing a suitor, thereby avoiding potential conflicts with powerful neighbouring rulers.

In the epics, the grand Svayaṃvaras function as significant narrative devices leading to the marriages of several female protagonists. Brockington asserts that the original svayaṃvaras in these epics are centred on valour, such as Draupadi's svayaṃvara, which was written in the early epic phase of the Mahābhārata, where Arjuna, disguised as a brāhmaṇa, wins her hand through an extraordinary display of archery skill. Brockington also observes that the story of Sāvitrī, where her father is unable to find her a husband, leading her to choose one herself, closely aligns with the practices outlined in the Dharmashastra. However, despite this similarity, the epic authors do not classify it as a "svayaṃvara." The portrayal of svayaṃvara in the Rāmāyaṇa, particularly regarding Sītā, shifts to a more religious and moral framework, emphasising the divinity of the protagonist Rāma. The concept of svayaṃvara continued to evolve in later Indian literature, often highlighting the bride’s autonomy or divine intervention. Stories such as those of Damayantī and Rukmiṇī, written in the later phase of the epic era, illustrate a shift towards individual agency and romantic ideals. Svayamvara remained as a significant plot device in many classical and mediaeval literature such as Kālidāsa’s Raghuvaṃśa and Chand Bardai's Prithviraj Raso.

== Types ==
Scholars tend to classify the self-choice ceremony in the Hindu literature into two broad categories:

- Svayaṃvara that provided the princess the freedom to choose her suitor from a host of assembled suitors up to her own liking with the parents' approval. It is also sometimes referred to as Saundaryaśulkā, and svayamvaras of Damayanti in the Mahābhārata and Indumati in the Raghuvaṃśa fall under this category. Scholars such as Jaimison consider the Dharmashashtra version as a sub-type of this category.
- Vīryaśulkā refers specifically to a type of Svayaṃvara where the bride is won through a contest of valor or strength, typically involving a heroic feat. (Note: The term vīrya means "valor" or "heroism," and śulka can mean "price" or "bride-price." Therefore, in a Vīryaśulkā marriage, the bride is metaphorically the "prize" for the hero who succeeds in the contest.) It contrasts with the idea of a Svayaṃvara where the bride might have more direct agency in choosing her partner. Draupadi, Ambā and her sisters in the Mahābhārata or Sītā in the Rāmāyaṇa chose their suitors in this form of svayamvara. Notably, scholars note that Vīryaśulkā appears as a distinct sub-type of Svayaṃvara, emphasizing the heroic or martial qualities of the suitor, rather than the bride's choice.

According scholar Vettam Mani, the scripture Devī Bhāgavatapurāṇa classifies Svayaṃvara into three types. The first, Icchā Svayaṃvara, allowed the bride complete freedom to choose her husband based on her preference. It involved an assembly at which the bride-to-be simply chooses between her suitors, with Damayantī’s Svayaṃvara being a prime example. The second type, Savyavasthā Svayaṃvara, required the suitor to meet specific qualifications, such as Rāma drawing the bow of Śiva to win Sītā. The third type, Śauryaśulka Svayaṃvara, involved a contest or challenge for the bride’s hand, exemplified by Arjuna's marriage to Draupadī.

== Structure and symbolism ==
Svayamvara was conducted after a royal girl reached puberty, or attained maidenhood. In Sanskrit literature, the svayamvara follows a highly structured sequence, as outlined by linguist Stephanie Jamison:

1. Invitation, assembly, and entertainment of suitors: The King, also the father of the bride, formally invite and host eligible suitors, creating a public platform for the marriage selection.
2. Display of bride: The bride is ceremoniously presented, often adorned to signal her eligibility and social standing.
3. Proclamation of suitors: Each suitor is formally introduced, with announcements detailing their family backgrounds and qualifications.
4. Announcement of contest (in Vīryaśulka Svayamvaras): In cases where a contest is involved, its nature and requirements are publicly declared.
5. Contest (in Vīryaśulka Svayamvaras): Suitors undertake feats of valor or skill, such as archery or combat, to demonstrate their worthiness.
6. Bride’s choice: The bride signifies her selection by placing the ceremonial garland on the chosen suitor, finalizing her decision in front of the gathered assembly.

While the svayamvara was not a marriage itself, it marked the woman’s selection of a partner, and additional rites often followed to formalize the union. Draupadi’s svayamvara with the Pandavas in the Mahābhārata and Indumati’s in Kālidāsa’s Raghuvaṃśa both culminate in kanyādāna-style weddings. This suggests that, in many contexts, svayamvara served as a preliminary selection process that required subsequent marriage rites to formalize the union in line with social expectations.

Scholars observe that the svayamvara format appears to be restricted to royal daughters of the Kshatriya caste. However, a few instances of inter-caste unions are recorded, though these often led to conflict and disapproval. (Note: In the Ṛg veda, for instance, a princess chose Vimada, a rishi (sage), but as they traveled to his home, other suitors attacked the couple. Similarly, when Arjuna, disguised as a Brahmin, won Draupadī's hand, the other suitors reacted with anger, leading to a duel that was ultimately resolved upon the revelation of Arjuna's true identity.) Historian Romila Thapar notes that svayamvaras were frequently seen as status symbols among royal families, who used them to enhance their social standing. Thapar argues that marriage into a prestigious family was essential because such alliances legitimised claims to land, political power, and further connections. The svayaṃvara ceremony, although appearing to grant the woman agency in choosing her husband, was structured to fit patriarchal norms; it was essentially a ritual in which the woman was ‘gifted’ in marriage. This ceremony underscored the role of the kṣatriya as a primary giver of gifts. According to scholars, the svayamvara was also a potential source of conflict and violence in many cases, often placing the bride’s family in a precarious situation. Rejected suitors were sometimes hostile, and tales of retaliatory violence are prominent in epic and classical poetry. For example, after Indumatī’s svayamvara in Kālidāsa’s Raghuvaṃśa, suitors ambush the newlyweds, leading to a dramatic confrontation resolved only by the bridegroom’s strategic use of a magic arrow.

Scholars also observe that, despite its literal meaning, most svayaṃvaras did not provide complete freedom of choice to the bride. According to Shakambari Jayal, svayaṃvara may have allowed for some degree of preference rather than full autonomy in choosing a spouse. According to Schmidt, despite the ceremony’s premise of self-choice, it is apparent in many literary accounts that the choice was sometimes predetermined or at least heavily influenced by the family. In agreement with Schmidt, Jamison warns that the term "svayamvara" misleadingly suggests the girl has independent control, whereas her autonomy is significantly restricted. The father manages the proceedings, including inviting suitors and determining their eligibility. Few svayamvaras genuinely allow for free choice; instead, they typically follow the vīryaśulka model, where suitors compete in tests of valor set by the father, culminating in the girl selecting a "winner." This process resolves the father's concerns but leaves little room for the daughter’s independent decision-making.

== Svayaṃvara in the Ṛg Veda ==
The Ṛg Veda, being one of the oldest and most enigmatic texts in Indian literature, provides limited direct evidence for Svayaṃvara. Some scholars, such as Hanns-Peter Schmidt, argue that the evidence is too indirect and that the Ṛg Veda does not provide a clear picture of the Svayaṃvara as an established institution. He suggests that the Ṛg Vedic poets may have been more concerned with cosmic and symbolic themes than with depicting real social institutions. Schmidt proposed that though svayamvara is not present in the Vedas, but the custom reflects an older Indic custom with Indo-European parallels, particularly in Zoroastrian Iran. However, scholars such as Stephanie W. Jamison, suggest that the Ṛg Veda contains indirect references to Svayaṃvara through specific words and phrases that indicate the presence of this institution. One of the key terms she discusses is "vrá-", which she proposes might be a syncopated form of a feminine noun corresponding to the masculine "varū-", meaning "suitor" or "chooser." This term could refer to a "female chooser," implying a woman who selects her husband, which aligns with the concept of Svayaṃvara.

For example, Jamison analyzes the phrase "svayaṃ sā varūte" (she chooses for herself) as a possible underlying expression in the Ṛg Veda. Although this formula does not appear overtly in the text, Jamison argues that it might exist in a more subtle, encoded form, suggesting that the concept of a maiden choosing her own husband was known in Vedic society.

=== The Marriage of Sūryā ===
One of the most compelling pieces of evidence for the Svayaṃvara in the Ṛg Veda is found in the marriage of Sūryā, the daughter of the Sun. This myth, which is prominently featured in the Ṛg Vedic marriage hymn (X.85), serves as a divine model for human marriage and is often interpreted as reflecting a Svayaṃvara scenario. In this hymn, Sūryā is depicted as choosing her husband from among the gods, with the twin Aśvins being her primary suitors. Jamison points out that the repeated references to Sūryā's choice, the involvement of the Aśvins, and the emphasis on the chariot (a key element in the wedding) suggest a ritualized form of Svayaṃvara. She also notes that the Ṛg Veda uses the verb "vṛṇīta" (chooses) in contexts that imply a maiden’s active selection of her husband, further supporting the idea of Svayaṃvara.

The Ṛg Vedic poets often engage in formulaic play and metonymy, where different elements are substituted within a familiar formula. For example, in some hymns, the "chariot" of the Aśvins is chosen instead of the suitors themselves, indicating the close association between the vehicle and the husband in the wedding ritual. This kind of metonymic substitution suggests that the concept of choice (central to Svayaṃvara) was so embedded in the culture that it could be creatively manipulated by the poets.

=== Other instances ===
Jamision also cites that the passage the wedding of Sarañyu, mentioned in Rigveda 10.17.1, is a clear example of Svayaṃvara.

James Talboys Wheeler also recognised the presence of Svayaṃvaras in the Ṛg Veda, citing the example of Svayaṃvara of Sūryā and Vimada. Ancient scholar Sāyaṇa explains that Vimada, a young sage, was chosen by Princess Kamadhyu during her svayaṃvara ceremony. However, envious suitors attacked the couple as they returned to Vimada’s home. Vimada then invoked the Ashvins, who intervened to save them. Chatterjee suggests that this instance of svayaṃvara bears a striking resemblance to those found in the epics.

== Svayaṃvara in the Mahābhārata ==
The Mahābhārata, with its extensive narrative scope, features numerous instances of Svayaṃvara, predominantly associated with female protagonists of noble lineage. Svayaṃvara appears approximately 23 times in the Ādiparvan (the first book of the Mahābhārata), 15 times in the Vanaparvan, 6 times in the Udyogaparvan, 3 times in the Dronaparvan, 2 times in the Sāntiparvan, and 1 time each in the Sabha, Bhīṣmaparvan, and Anusāsanaparvans.

=== Draupadī’s Svayaṃvara ===
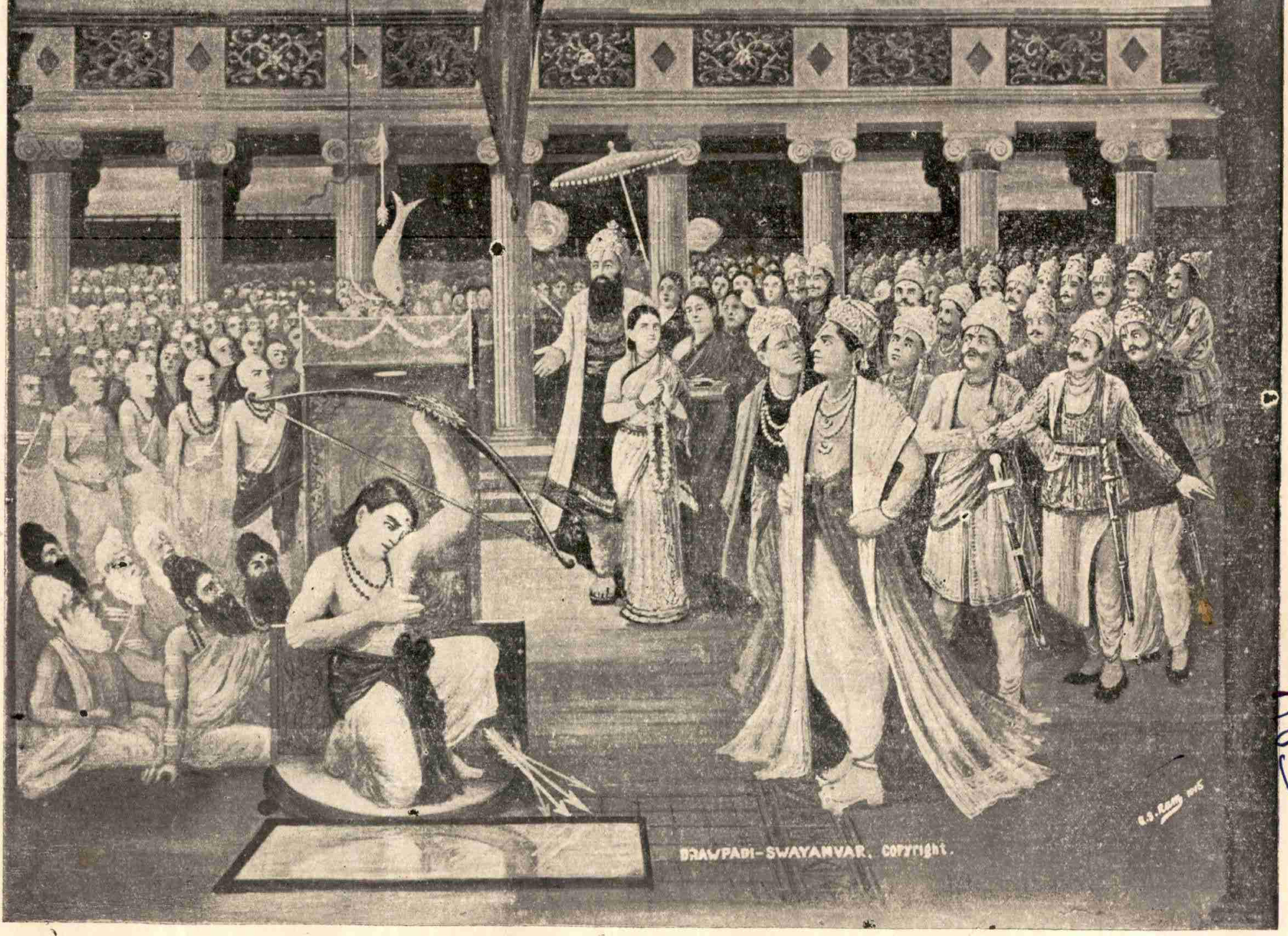
A 1910s artist's interpretation of Draupadi's Svayaṃvara

Draupadī’s Svayaṃvara is the most famous instance in the Mahābhārata. Textual references in the Mahābhārata provide a detailed account of this event. The Ādiparvan describes the preparation for the Svayaṃvara, the gathering of suitors, and the specific details of the contest (Mbh. 1.174-185). Draupadī herself refers to the event in later parts of the epic, indicating its lasting importance in her life and the broader story (Mbh. 2.62.4a).

Draupadī is the daughter of King Drupada of Pāñcāla. King Drupada organizes a Svayaṃvara to find a suitable husband for his daughter. He sets up a rigorous contest to determine Draupadī’s future husband. The central challenge involves a massive bow that must be strung and used to shoot an arrow at a revolving target while looking at its reflection in water kept beneath—a task requiring extraordinary strength, precision, and focus. The event attracts princes and warriors from across the land, including the Kauravas, Karṇa, and the Pandavas (who are in disguise). Among the competitors, Karṇa, known for his unmatched archery skills, steps forward to attempt the challenge. However, Draupadī, who is granted a degree of choice in the matter, rejects Karṇa, citing his low birth as a sūta (charioteer), though this scene is not universally agreed upon in various recensions of the text. There are variations regarding Karṇa's participation; many renditions of the text describe him failing to string the bow by the "breadth of a hair". (Note: According to the critical edition of the Mahābhārata from the Bhandarkar Oriental Research Institute, this incident of insulting or denial of Karna is an interpolation since this event is not available in the entire Kumbakonam version of the Mahābhārata (the southern text of the Mahābhārata), Sharada and Bengali manuscripts. He failed to string the legendary bow.)

Arjuna, disguised as a Brahmin (priest caste), then takes up the challenge. Despite his incognito appearance, Arjuna's inherent skill and divine favor enable him to accomplish the task with ease. He successfully strings the bow and hits the target, winning Draupadī's hand in marriage. The victory of Arjuna, a Kṣatriya warrior disguised as a Brahmin, sparks outrage among the other suitors, particularly the Kauravas and Karṇa. Upon returning to their mother Kuntī with Draupadī, Arjuna and his brothers inadvertently place her in a situation where she becomes the common wife of all five Pandavas. This unusual marital arrangement, while rooted in a misunderstanding, is sanctioned by divine and scriptural reasoning within the epic. Draupadī’s marriage to the Pandavas is not only integral to the plot but also symbolizes unity and shared responsibility among the brothers.

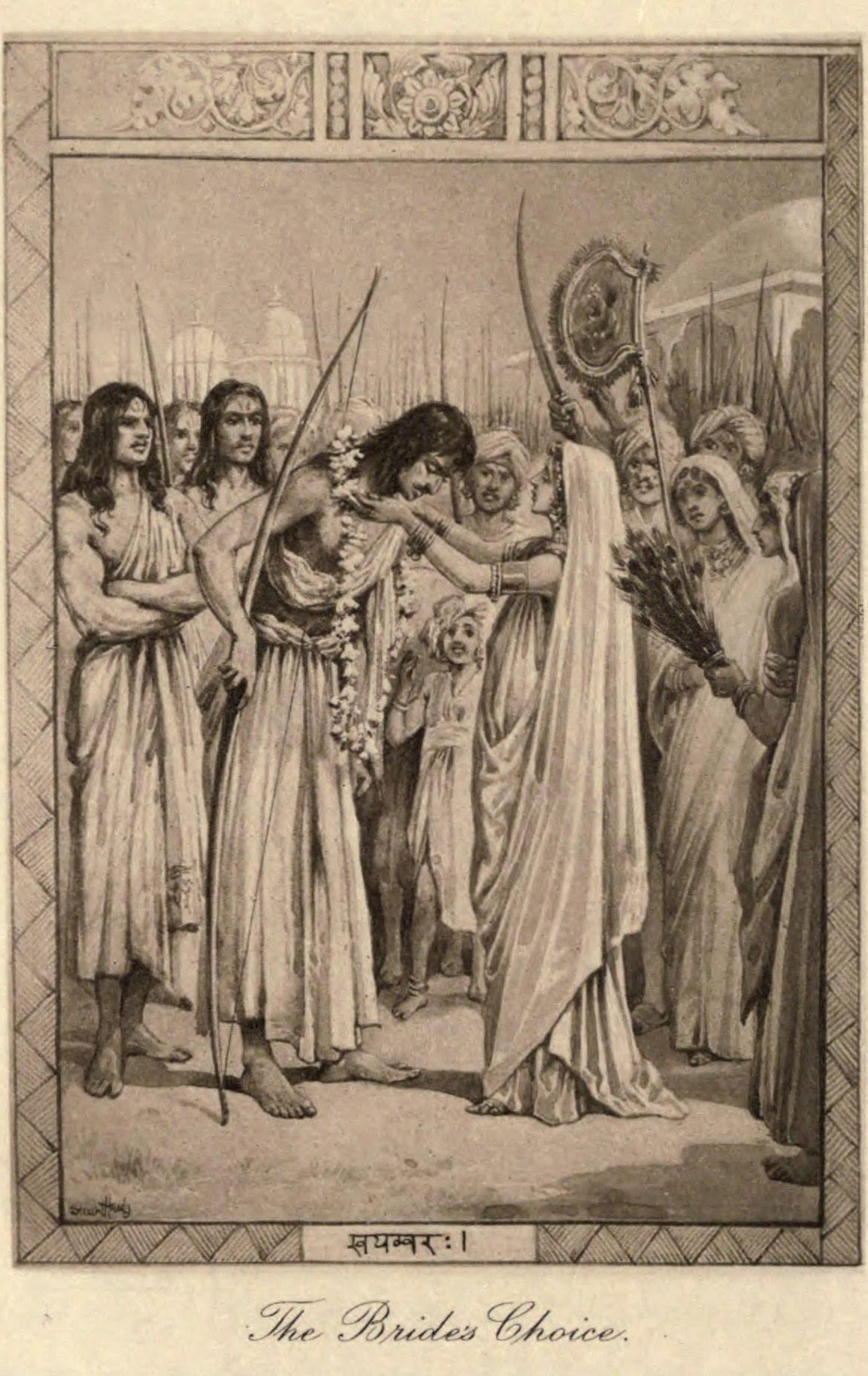
An illustration depicting Draupadi placing the ceremonial garland around her suitor's neck.

The significance of Draupadī’s Svayaṃvara extends far beyond the mere act of marriage. It acts as a pivotal catalyst for the myriad conflicts that propel the Mahābhārata's narrative. This event intensifies the resentment of the Kauravas and Karṇa towards the Pandavas, laying the groundwork for the rivalry that ultimately leads to the great Kurukṣetra war. Moreover, Draupadī’s Svayaṃvara underscores profound themes of fate, dharma, and divine intervention in human affairs. Her marriage to the Pandavas is not just a personal union but a fulfillment of a destiny intricately shaped by her past life and divine will. The Svayaṃvara also varies significantly across different recensions, reflecting the influence of local cultural contexts and the specific narrative priorities of diverse communities. For instance, some South Indian versions might place greater emphasis on divine intervention and Kṛṣṇa's role, whereas northern recensions may highlight different aspects. In certain versions, the focus might be on Draupadī’s autonomy and the implications of her marriage to the five Pandavas, while others might concentrate on the political ramifications of the Svayaṃvara, especially in relation to the Kauravas.

Scholars like J.L. Brockington and V.S. Sukthankar emphasize that Draupadī's Svayaṃvara is a quintessential example of the Kṣatriya ideal of heroism and valor. The contest where Arjuna wins Draupadī’s hand by hitting a target reflects the epic’s emphasis on martial prowess. Alf Hiltebeitel highlights the mythological and ritual symbolism of Draupadī’s Svayaṃvara, interpreting it as a key event that reinforces Draupadī’s central role in the cosmic and dharmic order of the epic. M.J. Kashalikar adds that different cultural and religious retellings, such as Jain texts, portray the Svayaṃvara with variations, reflecting diverse interpretations of her role. V.S. Sukthankar notes that few aspects of Draupadī’s Svayaṃvara, although potentially a later addition, is structurally essential to the epic, setting the stage for the conflicts and alliances that drive the narrative.

=== Damayantī’s Svayaṃvara ===
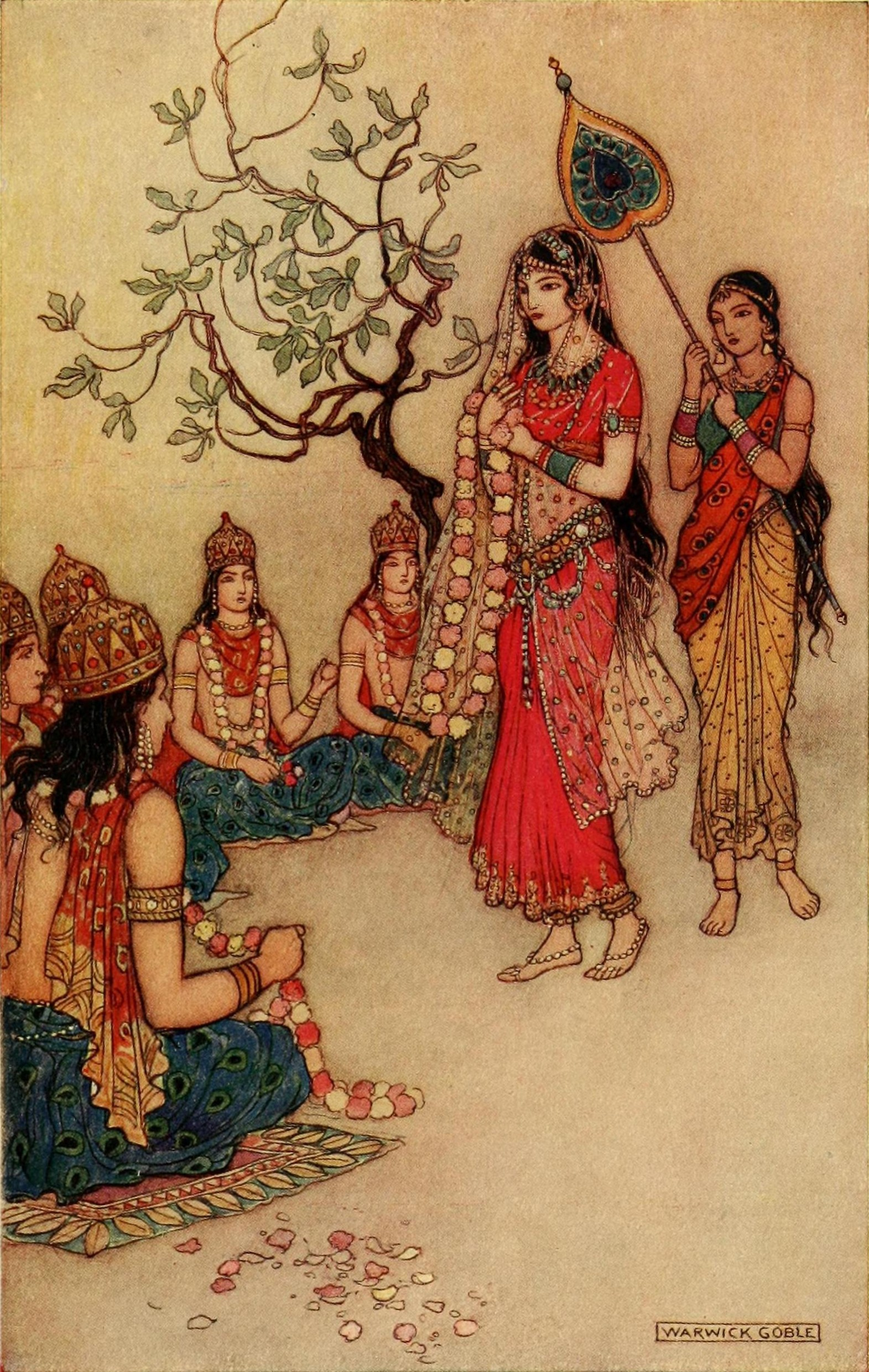
Damayanti's Svayamvara, attended by the gods disguised as Nala, illustrated by Warwick Goble, 1913

Damayantī’s Svayaṃvara is another prominent instance in the Mahābhārata. Her story is distinct within the epic because it involves not just one, but two Svayaṃvaras, illustrating that Svayaṃvaras could be held more than one time for a bride. Textual references in the Mahābhārata provide a detailed account of Damayantī’s Svayaṃvara. The episodes involving her first Svayaṃvara, her interactions with the gods, and her recognition of Nala are found in the Vana Parva (Mbh. 3.51-62), while the second Svayaṃvara and her reunion with Nala are described in the later sections of the same parva (Mbh. 3.68-72).

The first Svayaṃvara of Damayantī is organized by her father, King Bhīma, after he becomes aware of her deep affection for Nala, the king of Nishadha. Damayantī, having heard of Nala's virtues and character through messengers, falls in love with him even before meeting him. Nala, equally enchanted by the descriptions of Damayantī, also desires to marry her. King Bhīma invites kings and princes from across the land to participate in the Svayaṃvara. Among the suitors are not only human princes but also several gods who have disguised themselves as Nala to win Damayantī’s hand. The gods include Indra, Agni, Varuṇa, and Yama, who, despite their divine status, are unable to sway Damayantī’s heart away from Nala. When the time comes for her to make her choice, Damayantī, guided by her unwavering love, identifies Nala among the disguised gods. Her devotion is so strong that even the gods, recognizing her steadfast love and purity, bless the union instead of opposing it. Thus, Damayantī chooses Nala as her husband.

The second Svayaṃvara occurs under much different circumstances and is unique in the epic's context. After a series of misfortunes that lead Nala to abandon Damayantī, she is left heartbroken and alone. Believing Nala to be dead, and faced with the prospect of life without him, Damayantī decides to organize another Svayaṃvara. However, this time, the purpose is not merely to find a new husband but to uncover whether Nala is still alive. The conditions she sets for this Svayaṃvara are such that only Nala, disguised as Bahuka, can fulfill them. During the event, Damayantī recognizes Nala despite his disguise, and it restores their marriage and reaffirms their bond.

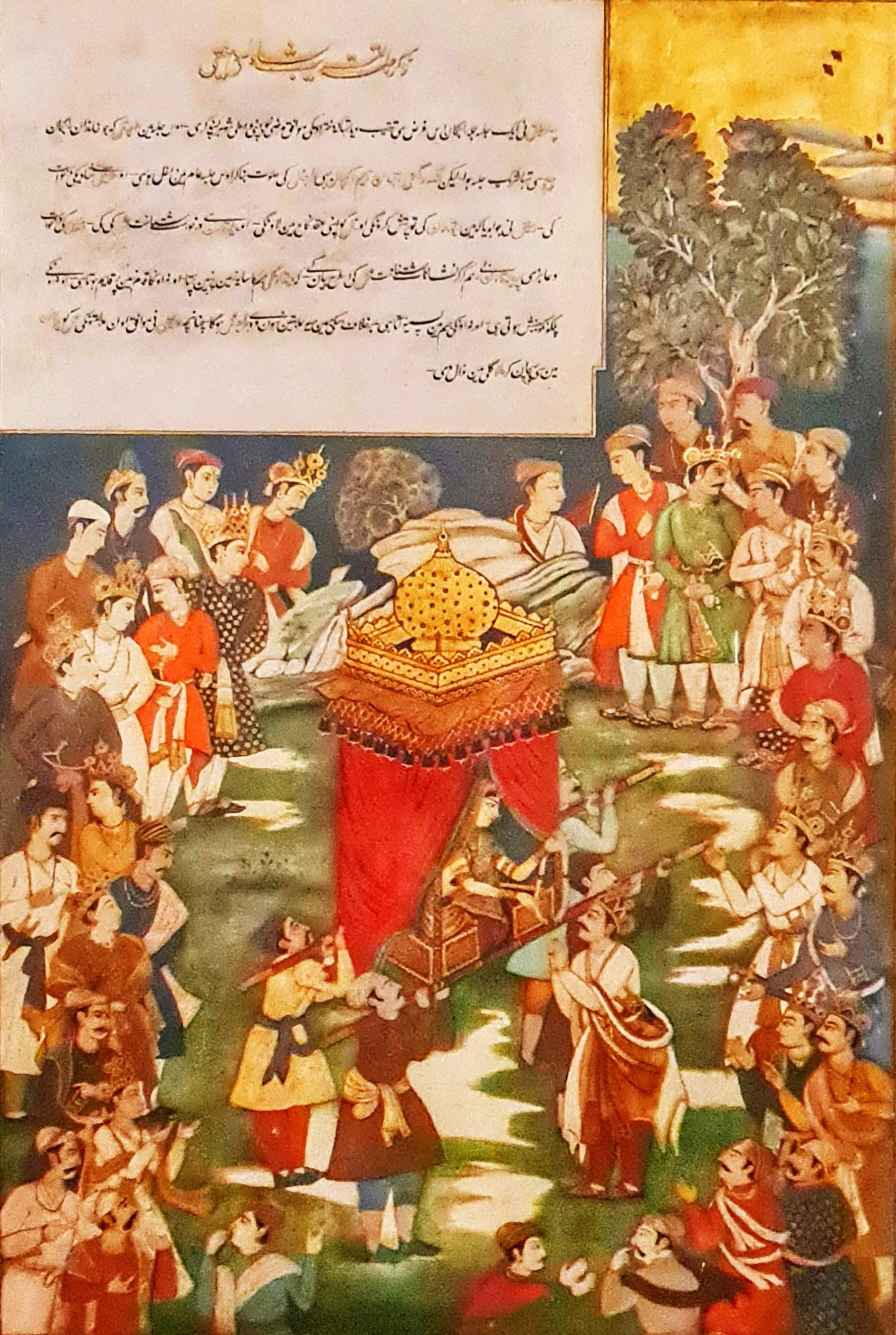
An illustration from Razmnama by Tulsi Kalan depicting the marriage ceremony of Damayanti, c. 1590 CE

Damayantī’s Svayaṃvara is significant for several reasons. It is one of the rare instances in the Mahābhārata where the bride’s personal choice is crucial to the marriage. Unlike other Svayaṃvaras that emphasize the suitors' valor or the father's decision, Damayantī’s choice is driven by love and personal conviction. Secondly, the involvement of the gods in her first Svayaṃvara underscores the theme of divine intervention in human affairs, a common motif in the Mahābhārata; but unlike other instances, the gods are treated as antagonists in her story. Thirdly, the second Svayaṃvara demonstrates Damayantī's resourcefulness and determination. Faced with the possibility of losing her husband forever, she takes active steps to uncover the truth and restore her marriage, showing both agency and resilience. This second Svayaṃvara also adds depth to her character, portraying her not just as a passive recipient of fate but as an individual capable of shaping her destiny.

Scholars describe it as a Svayaṃvara true to its literal meaning, where the bride enjoys full autonomy without paternal influence. They have noted that Damayantī’s Svayaṃvara exemplifies this ideal, with Thomas Parkhill discussing its romanticized narrative. Parkhill highlights that Damayantī’s love for Nala, established before the Svayaṃvara through hearsay, introduces a personal and emotional dimension, shifting from traditional heroic ideals to a more individualistic and romantic view. Brockington views this Svayaṃvara as a transitional phase in the portrayal of Svayaṃvaras, contrasting with Draupadī’s focus on martial prowess.

=== Svayaṃvara of princesses of Kāśī ===
The narrative of the Kāśī princesses—Ambā, Ambikā, and Ambālikā—particularly appears in the Ādiparvan (Book of Beginnings) and the Udyogaparvan (Book of Effort). The Kāśī princesses are expected to choose their husbands in their joint ceremony. Bhīṣma, the grand-uncle of the Kuru princes, attends the Svayaṃvara on behalf of his younger brother Vicitravīrya, who is too young and inexperienced to win a bride in combat. At the Svayaṃvara, Bhīṣma overpowers all the suitors and forcibly takes the three princesses back to Hastināpura. This action aligns with the Rākṣasa form of marriage, where a bride is taken by force after defeating her other suitors. Upon their return, Ambā, the eldest sister, reveals that she was already in love with Śālva, the king of Saubha, and had intended to marry him. Hearing this, Bhīṣma, adhering to his vow of celibacy, allows Ambā to go to Śālva. However, when Ambā reaches Śālva, he rejects her, citing his dishonor in being defeated by Bhīṣma. Left without a place or purpose, Ambā returns to Hastināpura, only to be refused by Bhīṣma, who tells her that she cannot marry Vicitravīrya after having declared her love for another man. This event leads Amba to vow revenge against Bhīṣma, which becomes a significant subplot in the Mahābhārata.

The Svayaṃvaras of the Kāśī princesses, particularly Ambā, are pivotal in the Mahābhārata. Ambā's confusion about whether her Svayaṃvara was meant for free choice or as a contest of strength leads to her later resentment and tragic conflict with Bhīṣma. Unlike Ambikā and Ambalikā, who do not object to marrying Bhīṣma's brother, Vichitravīrya, Ambā voices her objections only after reaching Bhīṣma's home. This discrepancy turns the Svayaṃvara into a focal point for assigning blame, with Amba grappling with responsibility—whether it lies with herself, her father, Bhīṣma, or Śālva. The text suggests that the failed expectations of the Svayaṃvara and Śālva’s inability to win play significant roles in Amba’s misfortune, highlighting the limited autonomy of the princesses, who are portrayed as passive in their destinies.

Scholarly assessments characterize this event as a violent assertion of power rather than a genuine Svayaṃvara where the bride has true choice. Bhīṣma’s actions disrupt the conventional contest among suitors, and he justifies his actions by prioritizing the Kṣatriya right to seize brides by force over the Svayaṃvara’s intended purpose. This reflects the tension between dharma and heroic ideals, with Bhīṣma’s actions having significant consequences for Amba, who later seeks revenge and becomes Śikhaṇḍī, playing a crucial role in Bhīṣma's death. Vanita Ruth discusses how Amba’s story illustrates the limitations of women’s agency and the tragic outcomes of male-dominated decisions and emphasizes how women were often treated as prizes in political and familial strategies. (Note: The outcomes of the svayaṃvara, especially Śālva's rejection of Amba, drive her to seek revenge, leading to her rebirth as Śikhaṇḍin, destined to cause Bhīṣma’s downfall. Ambikā and Ambālikā's subsequent marriages to Vichitravīrya also shape the lineage of the Kuru dynasty, affecting the epic's broader narrative.)

=== Other instances ===
In addition to the previously listed more famous instances, several other instances of Svayaṃvara are attested in the Mahābhārata. Kuntī participated in a Svayaṃvara arranged by her father, where she chose Pāṇḍu as her husband out of the crowd of suitors. Devakī, the mother of Kṛṣṇa, had a Svayaṃvara that is mentioned in the epic, though details are sparse. Mādhavī, after being passed among various kings by Galava to fulfill a dakṣiṇā, had a Svayaṃvara, but chose instead to live in the forest and embrace ascetism. Subhadrā's situation was also discussed in the context of Svayaṃvara, with Kṛṣṇa advising Arjuna to abduct (elope) her rather than rely on a traditional Svayaṃvara. Additionally, Devikā and Vijayā chose Yudhiṣṭhira and Sahadeva in their respective Svayaṃvara, while Bhīma won Valandharā's hand in marriage at her Vīryaśulkā. The daughter of King Citrāngada of Kaliṅga, rejects the suitor Duryodhana (antagonist of the epic) by walking past him. Despite her clear refusal, Duryodhana, driven by pride and with help from Karṇa, forcibly abducts her. This event is notable as it is the only instance in the Mahābhārata where a bride is taken against her will. (Note: Duryodhan later justifies his actions by referencing the abduction of the Kāśī princesses (Amba, Ambikā, and Ambālikā) by his grand-uncle. However, according to author Vanita Ruth, the text describes Bhīṣma’s actions of abducting the Kāśī princesses as being in line with the rākṣasa type of marriage, where a bride is taken by force after defeating other suitors, but it does not specifically note that their abduction was against their explicit will.)

==== Savitrī's marriage ====
Although not explicitly termed as Svayaṃvara, academics comment that the narrative of Sāvitrī's marriage closely aligns with its principles. They discuss the Svayaṃvara of Sāvitrī, along with Damayantī, as one of the more unusual and poignant instances of this practice, primarily because it closely adheres to the literal meaning of Svayaṃvara—self-choice—rather than the more common contest-based selection of a husband seen in other instances. In the story, when Savitrī, the renowned daughter of King Aśvapati of Mādra, reaches marriageable age, no suitor comes forward to ask for her hand, intimidated by her divine qualities and the virtue she possessed. Her father, concerned by this, instructs her to find a husband herself—a directive that perfectly aligns with the etymological essence of the term "Svayaṃvara". Savitrī travels on a chariot alone in search of a suitable match, which is unusual given the strict societal norms for women. Finally she finds her match in Satyavan, the son of a blind, exiled king. This Svayaṃvara is seen as an early and exceptional form, possibly reflecting an older tradition of more genuine female autonomy in marriage choices. This episode may reflect the Dharmaśāstra influence, where Svayaṃvara becomes a regulated means to ensure matrimonial compliance, diverging from the valor-centric Kṣatriya tradition.

=== In Harivaṃśa ===
The Harivaṃśa is a significant Sanskrit text that serves as an appendix to the Mahābhārata, providing additional details about the lives of the Yādava dynasty and the divine aspects of the Kṛṣṇa's life. It expands upon and complements the main narrative of the Mahābhārata by offering enriched stories and supplementary episodes, thus playing a crucial role in the development of the epic's overarching themes and characters.

In the Harivamśa, the portrayal of Svayaṃvara reveals an evolving narrative that emphasizes female autonomy. The text provides accounts of two significant Svayaṃvaras involving members of the Yādava dynasty. Rukmiṇī's Svayaṃvara, found in Appendix 20, though unconventional, involved her being abducted by Kṛṣṇa, whom she had already chosen in her heart. Rukmi’s daughter (Rukmiṇī's niece) held a Svayaṃvara where she selected Pradyumna, Kṛṣṇa's son, as her husband.

== Svayaṃvara in the Rāmāyaṇa ==
In contrast to the Mahābhārata, Svayaṃvara in the Rāmāyaṇa is less frequent, with the term appearing six times in the entire epic four in Ayodhyākāṇḍa, and one each in the Bālakāṇḍa and the Yuddhakāṇḍa. The Rāmāyaṇa emphasizes the moral and divine aspects of marriage, contrasting with the more martial and heroic portrayal in the Mahābhārata.

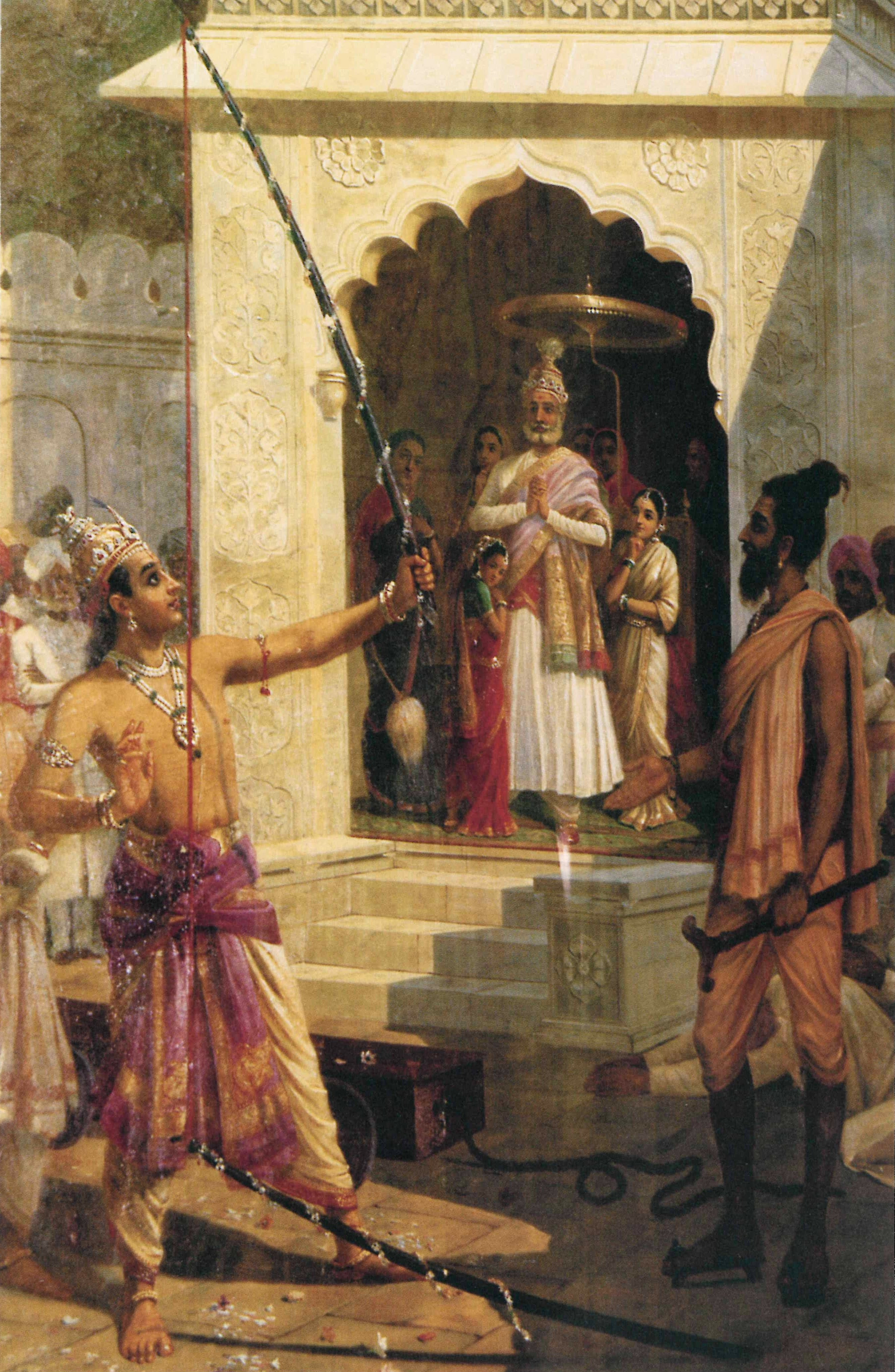
Rama breaks Shiva's bow at Sita's Svayaṃvara, a scene from the Ramayana painted by Raja Ravi Varma

=== Sītā’s Svayaṃvara ===
Sītā’s Svayaṃvara is a critical event in the Rāmāyaṇa, narrated in the Ayodhyākāṇḍa of the text. Organized by King Janaka of Mithilā, the Svayaṃvara was designed to find a suitable husband for Sītā, Janaka's daughter, who was renowned for her beauty, virtue, and divine origin. The challenge set for the suitors was to string and break a colossal bow, Pināka, which had once belonged to Lord Śiva. This bow was so formidable that none of the assembled princes and warriors from various kingdoms could even lift it, let alone string and break it.

The arrival of Rāma, the prince of Ayodhyā, at the Svayaṃvara marked a turning point in the event. Accompanied by his brother Lakṣmaṇa and the sage Viśvāmitra, Rāma stepped forward at Viśvāmitra’s encouragement. To the astonishment of everyone present, Rāma effortlessly lifted the bow, strung it, and broke it in half, thereby winning Sītā's hand in marriage. This act was not only a demonstration of Rāma’s physical strength but also a clear indication of his divine favor and destiny as the upholder of dharma. Following Rāma’s success, King Janaka was overjoyed and immediately offered Sītā to Rāma. However, Rāma, in adherence to the cultural norms of the time, sought the permission of his father, King Daśaratha of Ayodhyā, before accepting Sītā as his wife. Once Daśaratha gave his consent, the marriage was arranged with great ceremony, marking the union of two of the most revered figures in Hindu tradition.

The Svayaṃvara of Sītā holds significant importance in the Rāmāyaṇa for several reasons. Firstly, it highlights Rāma’s role as a divinely ordained hero, whose actions are guided by higher powers. His victory in the contest is portrayed as not just a feat of strength but as a fulfillment of his destiny. Secondly, the event reinforces the cultural values of the time, particularly the emphasis on strength and valor in choosing a husband, as well as the father’s role in arranging marriages. The bow of Śiva, central to the contest, symbolizes the weight of dharma, which Rāma, as an avatar of Vishnu, is destined to uphold. Textual references from the Rāmāyaṇa underscore the significance of this event. Sītā, when recounting her marriage to Anasūyā later in the epic, refers to it as a Svayaṃvara, emphasizing the traditional elements of choice and valor that defined the event (Rām. 2.110.47-52). Additionally, the description of the bow and the challenge it posed is detailed in the Bālakāṇḍa of the Rāmāyaṇa, where Janaka explicitly states that Sītā will marry only the man who can string the bow (Rām. 1.65-70).

Scholars note that the account of Sītā’s Svayaṃvara is presented differently in various parts of the Rāmāyaṇa, leading to inconsistencies. Specifically, Robert Goldman points out that while Sītā herself refers to her marriage as a Svayaṃvara in the Ayodhyākāṇḍa, the earlier Bālakāṇḍa presents the event with different details, with the Bālakāṇḍa focusing more on the heroic aspect of the contest and the Ayodhyākāṇḍa presenting a more romanticized and dhārmic version of the events. The word Svayaṃvara is never used in the Bālakāṇḍa; instead, the term "vīryaśulka" (prize of heroism) is repeatedly used to describe Sītā. This term contrasts with Sītā’s later description of her marriage as a Svayaṃvara in the Ayodhyākāṇḍa, where the emphasis is on her being given away by her father, Janaka. Goldman argues that Sītā's recounting in the Ayodhyākāṇḍa does not align perfectly with the events as they are narrated in the Bālakāṇḍa, indicating that the Rāmāyaṇa may have undergone textual evolution, with later additions or modifications affecting the consistency of the narrative.

=== Other instances ===
Another instance is the Svayaṃvara of the daughters of King Kuśanābha, mentioned in the Balakāṇḍa of the Rāmāyaṇa. When approached by the god Vāyu, the daughters refuse his advances, stating that their father will arrange their Svayaṃvara. This episode emphasizes the father's role in deciding marriage, with the daughters showing obedience to patriarchal norms. This Svayaṃvara does not actually result in a contest but underscores the theme of parental control over marriage choices, contrasting with the supposed freedom of choice implied in the Svayaṃvara tradition.

In the same section, the Rāmāyaṇa tells the tale of Somadā, a Gandharvī who persuades the sage Cūlina to marry her. While not a Svayaṃvara in the traditional sense, this story reflects a different form of marriage, where the woman takes the initiative, showing a variation on the theme of marriage choice.

== Svayaṃvara in Dharmaśāstra and other Smṛti literature ==
Scholars note that Svayaṃvara is conspicuously absent from the traditional lists of eight marriage types in the Dharmaśāstra, such as the Manusmṛti, though a version of it is described in the texts. Brockington also comments that absence of Svayaṃvara in the list has led to the classification of it as the ninth form of marriage. P.V. Kane and Heramba Chatterjee suggest that the Svayaṃvara may have been a later addition to the canon of marriage practices, possibly arising from less formalized traditions like the Gāndharva marriage, a form of marriage recognized in Smṛti literature that is based on mutual consent and affection.

Ludwik Sternbach explains that the ordinary Svayaṃvara in Smṛti literature is not a formalized or celebrated event as seen in epics but rather a legal provision that grants a maiden the right to choose her husband under specific circumstances. distinguishing it from the more celebrated and dramatic Svayaṃvaras depicted in ancient Indian epics. Sternbach identifies an "ordinary Svayaṃvara" within the Smṛti texts, which is not a grand public event but rather a legal provision that allows a maiden the right to choose her husband if her father or guardian fails to arrange her marriage within a specified period after she reaches puberty. This period, as outlined in various Smṛtis such as the Manusmṛti and Yājñavalkya Smṛti, is generally three years or three menstrual cycles. Sternbach explains that this provision underscores the practical concerns of ensuring timely marriages and the importance of procreation in ancient Indian society, which viewed remaining unmarried as socially and religiously undesirable.

In terms of conditions and restrictions, Sternbach notes that while the ordinary Svayaṃvara grants the maiden some autonomy, her choice is still governed by societal expectations. The Smṛtis require that the chosen husband be of equal caste and rank, blameless in character, and suitable in terms of family background, age, health, and other qualities. This ensures that even though the woman is exercising her right to choose, her choice aligns with and reinforces the established social hierarchy. The ordinary Svayaṃvara thus serves as a corrective measure, allowing a woman to marry if her guardian fails in his duties, but still within a controlled framework that upholds social order.

Sternbach also draws a connection between the ordinary Svayaṃvara and the Gāndharva vivāha. He suggests that the ordinary Svayaṃvara is closely linked to this concept, reflecting similar values of personal choice and agency. However, the Smṛtis emphasize that this autonomy is exercised within limits, ensuring that the marriage conforms to societal norms. Sternbach further discusses how the Smṛtis provide practical guidelines on how a woman should proceed with her choice if she finds herself in this situation, including instructions on approaching the desired man and maintaining propriety throughout the process.

== In historical records ==
Scholars note that most instances of Svayamvara are found in the epics, but actual historical cases are rare.

One notable historical reference to this practice appears in the Junagadh Rock Inscription of Rudradaman, dated to around AD 150. In this inscription, Rudradaman, a prominent ruler of the Western Kshatrapa dynasty, is praised not only for his military conquests and administrative achievements but also for his participation in svayaṃvaras of royal daughters.

In a later Persian source, the concept of svayamvara is presented within the context of a conflict between two brothers—Ramagupta and Chandragupta II (reigning from 375 to 415). The account reveals that Ramagupta abducted Dhruvadevi from her svayamvara, fully aware that she was in love with Chandragupta II. Subsequent verses recount how Chandragupta II ultimately killed Ramagupta and married Dhruvadevi.

The most famous example of Svayaṃvara in its historical context is the legendary tale of Prithviraja III, King of Sapadalaksha (1166 – 1192), and Sanyogita, the princess of Kanauj, as narrated in the semi-historical epic poem Prithvirajaraso, composed by the bard Chand Bardai.

== Similar practices ==
=== Kitayun ===
The Shahnama of Ferdausi records a similar tradition in pre-Islamic Iran, of one Kitayun, eldest daughter of the Emperor of Constantinople, selecting the Iranian Gushtasp. With a view to procure a husband for one of his daughters, the Byzantine emperor determined to hold a grand assembly of illustrious and wise men for her to see and select from. She did not find a suitable husband in the first assembly, so a second one was held, where she placed the crown on Gushtasp's head. Gushtasp, also known as Vishtaspa, returned to Iran with his bride and was crowned King.

As per the custom of Rum, when a princess reached marriageable age, all the princes and nobles would gather in a hall where the princess would enter with her handmaidens and would select one of the princes to be her husband.

Rum (literally "Rome") was the common name used for the Eastern Roman or Byzantine Empire by Middle Eastern people.

Author Amina Shah published a Central Asian tale titled Gushtasp and the Princess of Roum. In this tale, Iranian prince Gushtasp goes to the land of Roum, and falls in love with its princess, Katayun. The princess wants to be married, and the king holds an assembly, as it was custom in that land, for the princesses to choose husbands by giving them bouquets of flowers, indicating their choices. In the gathering of suitors, princess Katayun circles around the men, sights Gushtasp, gives him her bouquet, then leaves with her sisters.

== See also ==
- Hindu marriage
- Harana (elopement)
- Bride-show
