= Gandharva marriage =

One of the eight hindu marriage styles

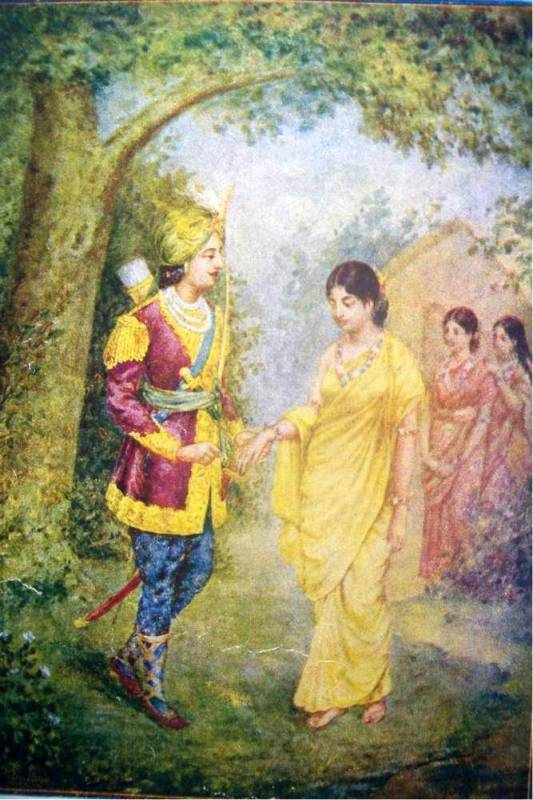
Dushyanta & Shakuntala in the Hindu epic Mahabharata. The son that resulted from their Gandharva marriage was named Bharata.

A Gandharva marriage (Sanskrit: गान्धर्व विवाह, gāndharva vivāha, IPA: [gənd̪ʱərvə vɪvaːhə]) is one of the eight classical types of Hindu marriage. This ancient tradition from the Indian subcontinent was based on consensual acceptance between a man and a woman, with no rituals, witnesses or family participation. The marriage of Dushyanta and Shakuntala is a celebrated example of this class of marriage in ancient Indian literature.

== Etymology ==
In Hinduism and Buddhism, Gandharvas are male nature spirits and the masculine counterparts of the Apsaras. They are passionate lovers of women and arouse erotic and romantic passion in women.

== History ==
The Smritis of Hinduism recognize eight types of marriage, one of them being Gandharva marriage. The other seven are: Brahma, Daiva, Arya, Prajapatya, Asura, Raksasa and Paisacha.

According to Apastamba Grhyasutra, an ancient Hindu literature, the woman chooses her own husband in Gandharva marriage. They meet each other of their own accord, consent to live together, and their relationship is consummated in copulation born of passion. This form of marriage did not require consent of parents or anyone else. According to Vedic texts, this is one of earliest and common forms of marriage in Rig Vedic times.

In Rig Vedic opinions and classical literature, the commonly described marriage type was Gandharva, where the woman and the man had met each other in their ordinary village life, or in various other places such as regional festivals and fairs, begun to enjoy each other's company, and decided to be together. This free choice and mutual attraction were generally approved by their kinsmen. A passage in the Atharvaveda suggests that parents usually let the daughter freely select her lover and directly encouraged her in being forward in affairs of the heart. The mother of the girl thought of the time when the daughter's developed youth (Pativedanam, post-puberty), that she would win a husband for herself, it was a smooth and happy sort of affair with nothing scandalous and unnatural about it. The translated version of the Atharvaveda (Strikaratâni, ii.36) passage is:

May (Oh Agni!) a suitor after our own heart come to us;
may he come to this maiden with fortune;
May she be agreeable to suitors,
charming at festivals,
promptly obtain happiness through a husband.

As this comfortable cave (Oh Indra!) furnishing a safe abode
hath become pleasing to all life,
thus may this woman be a favourite of fortune,
well beloved,
not at odds with her husband!

Do thou ascend the full, inexhaustible ship of fortune
to bring hither to this woman the suitor who shall be agreeable to thee.
Bring hither by thy shouts (Oh lord of wealth!) the suitor –
bend his mind towards her.
Turn thou the attention of every agreeable suitor to her.

In Mahabharata, one of two major epics of Hindus, Rishi Kanva, the foster father of Shakuntala, recommends Gandharva marriage with the statement “The marriage of a desiring woman with a desiring man, without religious ceremonies, is the best marriage.” Elsewhere in Mahabharata (iii:190.36), the epic says “No man any longer asks for the daughter, nor does a father give away his daughter, they (women) find the man for themselves.”

== Historic debate ==
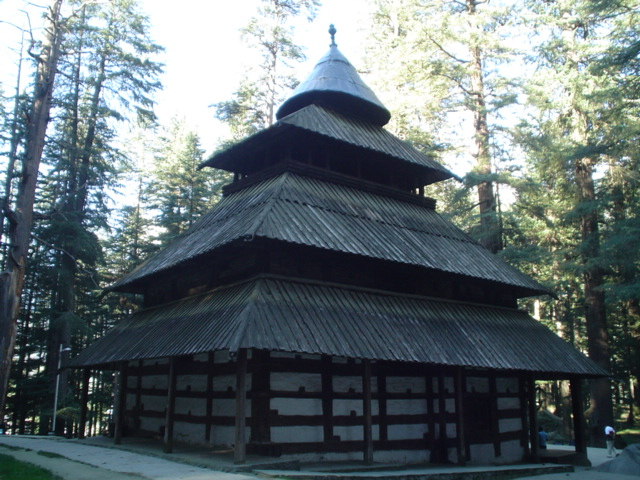
Hidamba Devi Temple in Manali (India) - dedicated to the wife of Pandava Bheema, joined by Gandharva marriage

Gandharva marriage over time became controversial, disputed and debated. Majority of ancient scholars discouraged it on religious and moral grounds. One argument found in the classical literature is that Gandharva marriage ignores the sacred rituals and vows the groom and bride must make to each other. Such a marriage, argued those ancient Vedic scholars, may or may not be lasting since it did not involve Agni. Over time, Gandharva marriages were either opposed or done with the use of Agni to ensure the longevity of the marriage through vows.

Manu goes on to state that Gandharva marriage is only suited for males who are priests, warriors, serving in the military, administrators, nobility and rulers. Baudhayana claims that it is lawful for people of Vaishya and Shudra varnas. However, he evidently thinks that maidens who decide to do so are not of much value after all. Narada, yet another ancient scholar who wrote Nāradasmṛti sometime between 100 BC and 400 AD, suggests Gandharva marriage is permitted for everyone. Calling it sadharana, Narada claims the only types of marriage that are wrong are those that are based on abduction, forced, violence, fraud or purchase.

== Decline ==
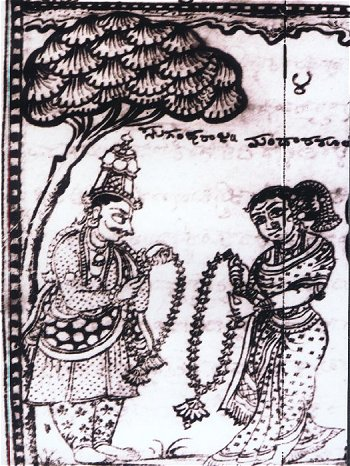
Gandharva marriage: couple exchange garlands under a tree. Illustration from Sougandhika Parinaya written in Kannada

There is no consensus theory to explain why Gandharva marriages have declined over the ages. One theory claims that as prosperity and wealth increased, parents sought greater control of the activities and social life of their children. Pandey claims Hindu ideology shifted from diversity of marriage types to where the social pressures compelled the girl's family to seek arranged early marriages. Yet another theory is that the priestly caste of India, who officiated Brahma marriages and religious ceremonies, over time crafted rules that declared Gandharva marriage for most Hindus as inappropriate and disapproved (aprasasta).
