= Suicide of Atul Subhash =

Suicide of an Indian engineer

- Date: 9 December 2024
- Location: Bengaluru, Karnataka, India
- Type: Suicide by hanging
- Cause: Harassment and judicial misconduct
- Deaths: 1 (Atul Subhash)
- Arrests: 3 (Estranged wife, her mother, and her brother)

Atul Subhash (25 January 1990 – 9 December 2024) was a software engineer and artificial intelligence professional from Bengaluru, India, who was found dead in his apartment at Marathahalli, having died by suicide by hanging. The incident sparked discussions about various issues related to matrimonial disputes in India, regarding discrimination against men, dowry laws, judicial corruption in India, and mental health awareness.

== Background ==
=== Marriage and divorce ===
Subhash was originally from Bihar and was involved in a divorce and custody dispute with his estranged wife, Nikita Singhania. The couple, married in 2019, lived separately for three years since 2021 and had a four-year-old son together. Allegations of harassment, extortion, and financial demands marked the divorce proceedings.

=== Court proceedings ===
Subhash's note contained allegations that his in-laws had requested a settlement of ₹3 crore (US$310,000) and ₹30 lakh (US$31,000) for visitation rights to their son as part of the divorce proceedings and had asked to raise monthly maintenance from ₹40,000 (US$420) to ₹2 lakh (US$2,100). Subhash was earning ₹84,000 (US$870) monthly and was asked to pay ₹40,000 (US$420) monthly amount towards his son in July 2024, but was not asked to compensate for his wife as she was earning well in Delhi. Subhash did not approach his lawyer for appealing to lower the monthly maintenance since. Subhash had to travel frequently from Bangalore to the court in Jaunpur which had no online conferencing option, since he was unable to change the location despite challenging it in court. At the time of his death, he had attended 120 hearings in 3 years and was facing 6 cases, including for domestic violence and dowry harassment.

=== Suicide ===
On 9 December, Subhash was found dead in his apartment at Marathahalli, having died by suicide by hanging. Before his death, Subhash left behind a 24-page document and an 81‑minute video recording. In these documents, he expressed his concerns and grievances regarding his divorce and custody case. He stated that the legal system was biased, particularly Section 498A of the Indian Penal Code, which aims to protect women from domestic violence and dowry-related harassment. He also accused the Jaunpur District Court judge, Reeta Kaushik, of asking for a 5 lakh bribe to settle the case, and taunting him into committing suicide when he refused.

A police investigation was conducted, and Singhania and several family members were charged under Section 309 of the Indian Penal Code (IPC) related to abetment to suicide. The Bengaluru Court granted them bail in December 2024.

== Aftermath ==
Subhash left behind a suicide note titled "This ATM has been closed permanently", which became a rally cry for victims of the Legal System in India, and allowed them to seek help from men's rights organizations such as the Save Indian Family Foundation. The death of Subhash led to widespread discussion and debate about the rights of men in India. Some advocates argued that reforms are needed in the family law system, citing concerns about potential misuse of existing laws.

Subhash's case resulted in attention to various men who committed suicides after judicial abuse under similar circumstances, such as Suresh Sathadiya, Nitin Padiyar, and Puneet Khurana. Supreme court has since released an 8 point factors to decide alimony amount and warned courts against misuse of relevant laws.

Subhash's death also sparked backlash against feminism among men's rights activists and certain online commentators. Subhash himself wrote a commentary on women empowerment and feminism in the letters he left behind, expressing paranoid views such as views against abortion, DEI hiring of women in military and criminalization of marital rape.

== See also ==
- Men's rights movement in India
- Suicide in India
- Manav Singh
- Domestic violence against men
