= Marriage in Hinduism =

Concept of marriage in Hindu tradition

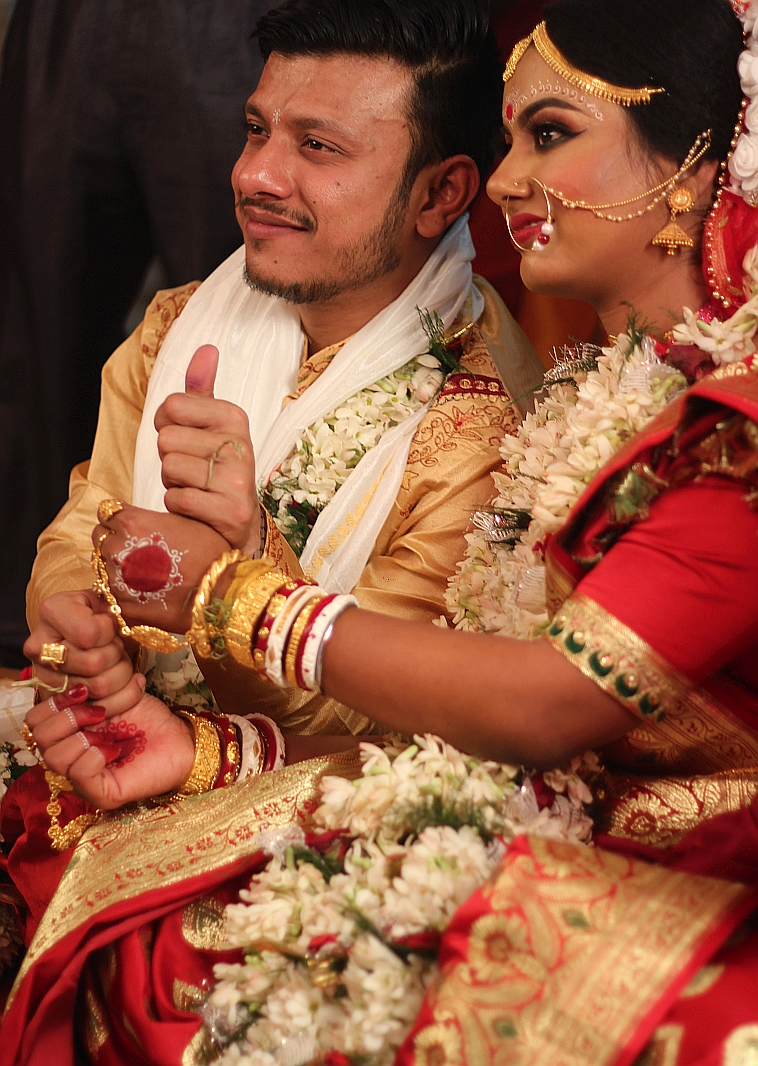
A Bengali Hindu couple during their wedding ceremony

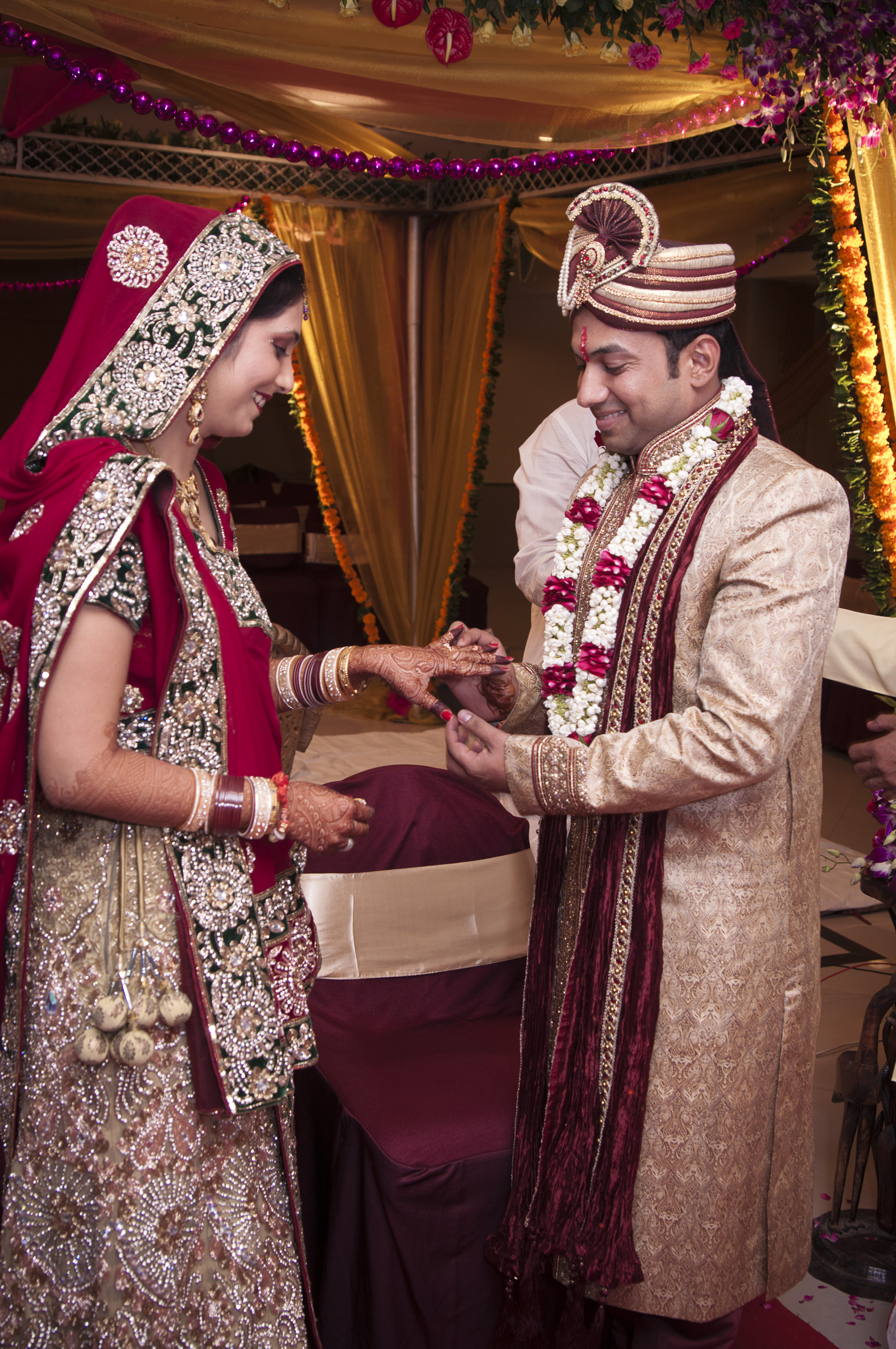
A Gujarati Hindu couple wearing traditional attire during a ring ceremony

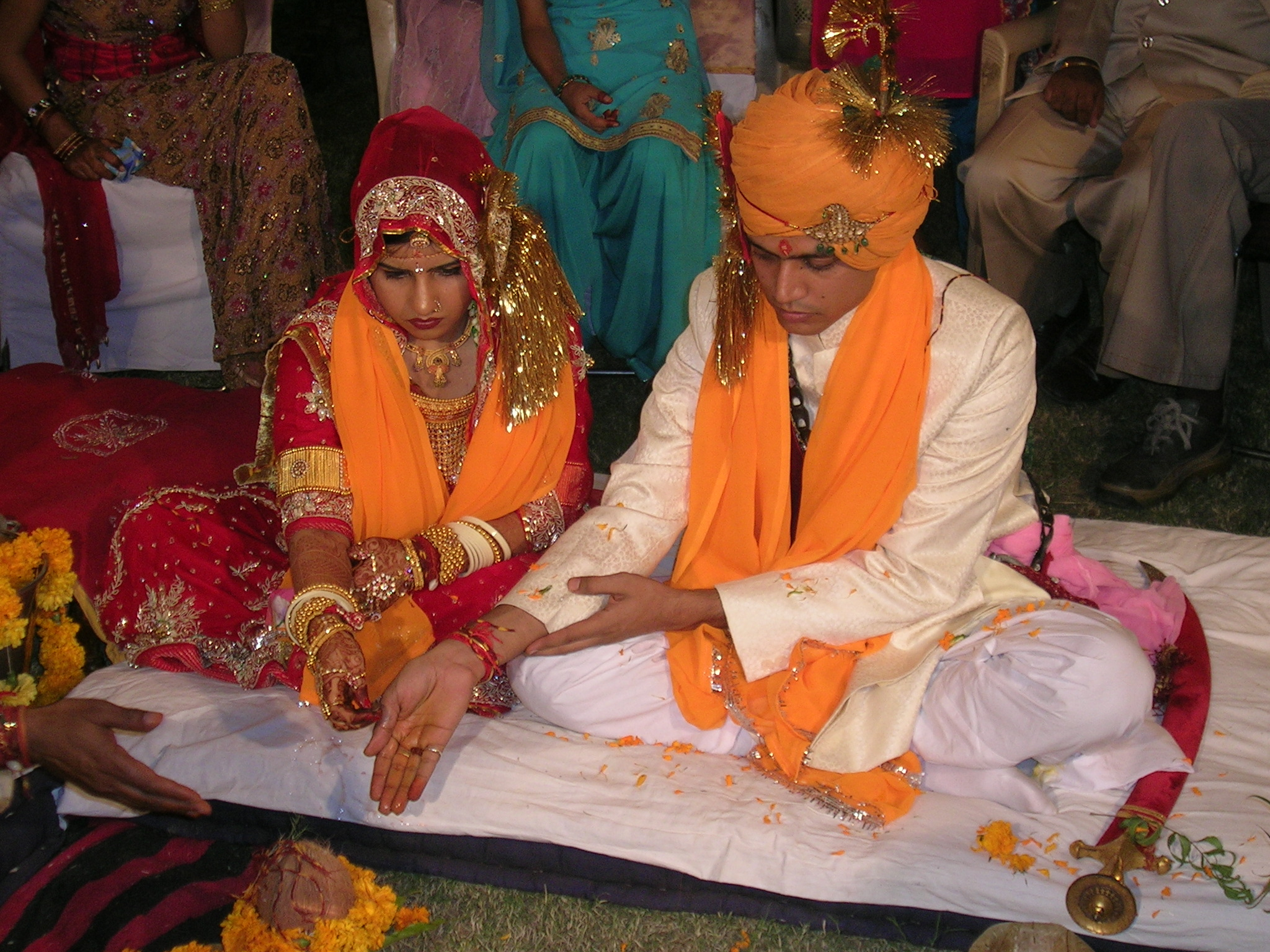
A Rajput Hindu couple making an offering during their wedding ceremony

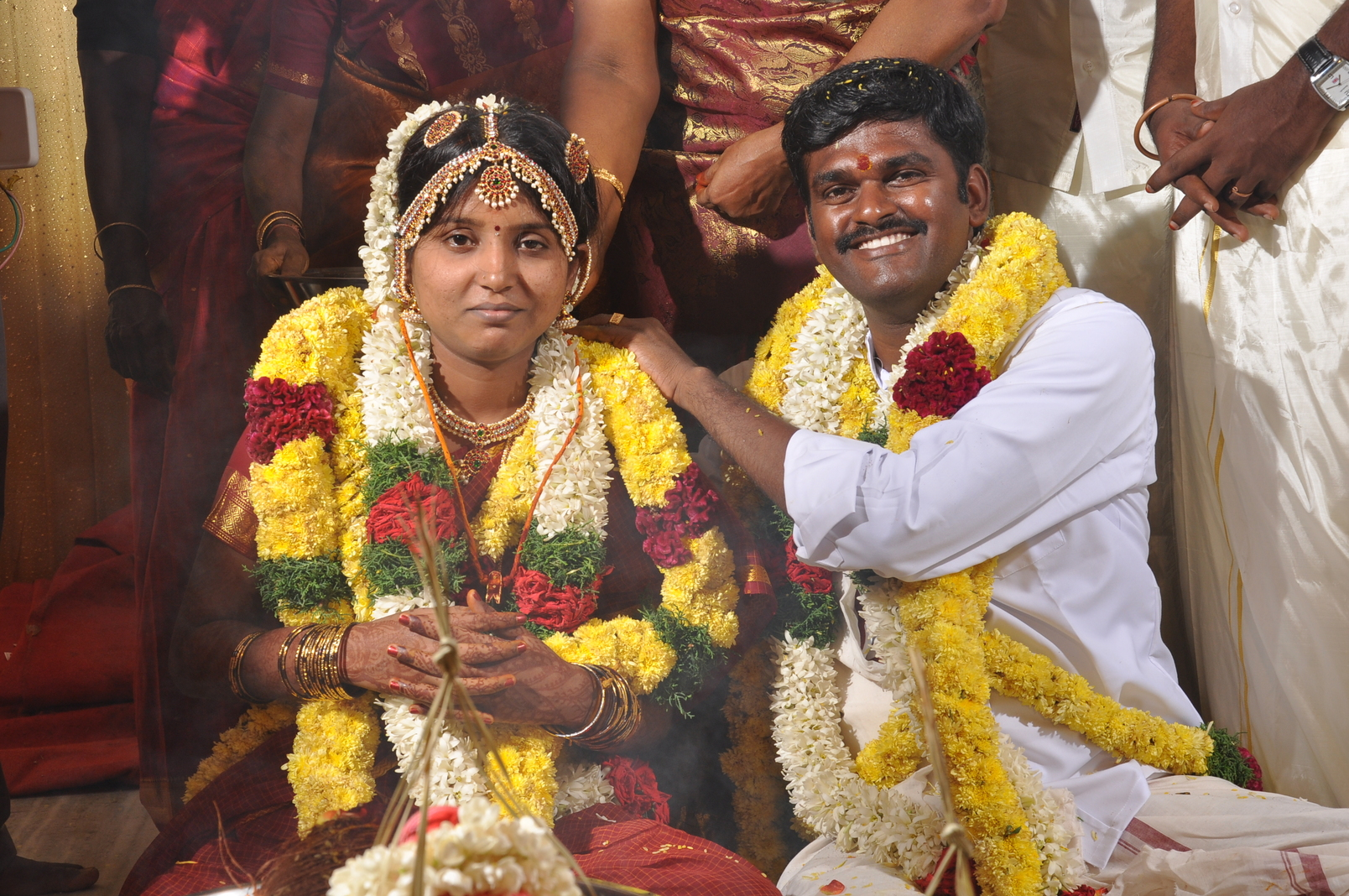
A Tamil Hindu couple during their wedding ceremony

The Hindu marriage (Sanskrit: विवाह, romanized: Vivāha, lit. 'Marriage') is the most important of all the samskaras, the rites of passage described in the Dharmashastra texts.

Variously defined, it is generally described to be a social institution for the establishment and regulation of a proper relationship between the sexes, as stated by Manu. Marriage is regarded to be a sacrament by Hindus, rather than a form of social contract, since they believe that all men and women are created to be parents, and practise dharma together, as ordained by the Vedas.

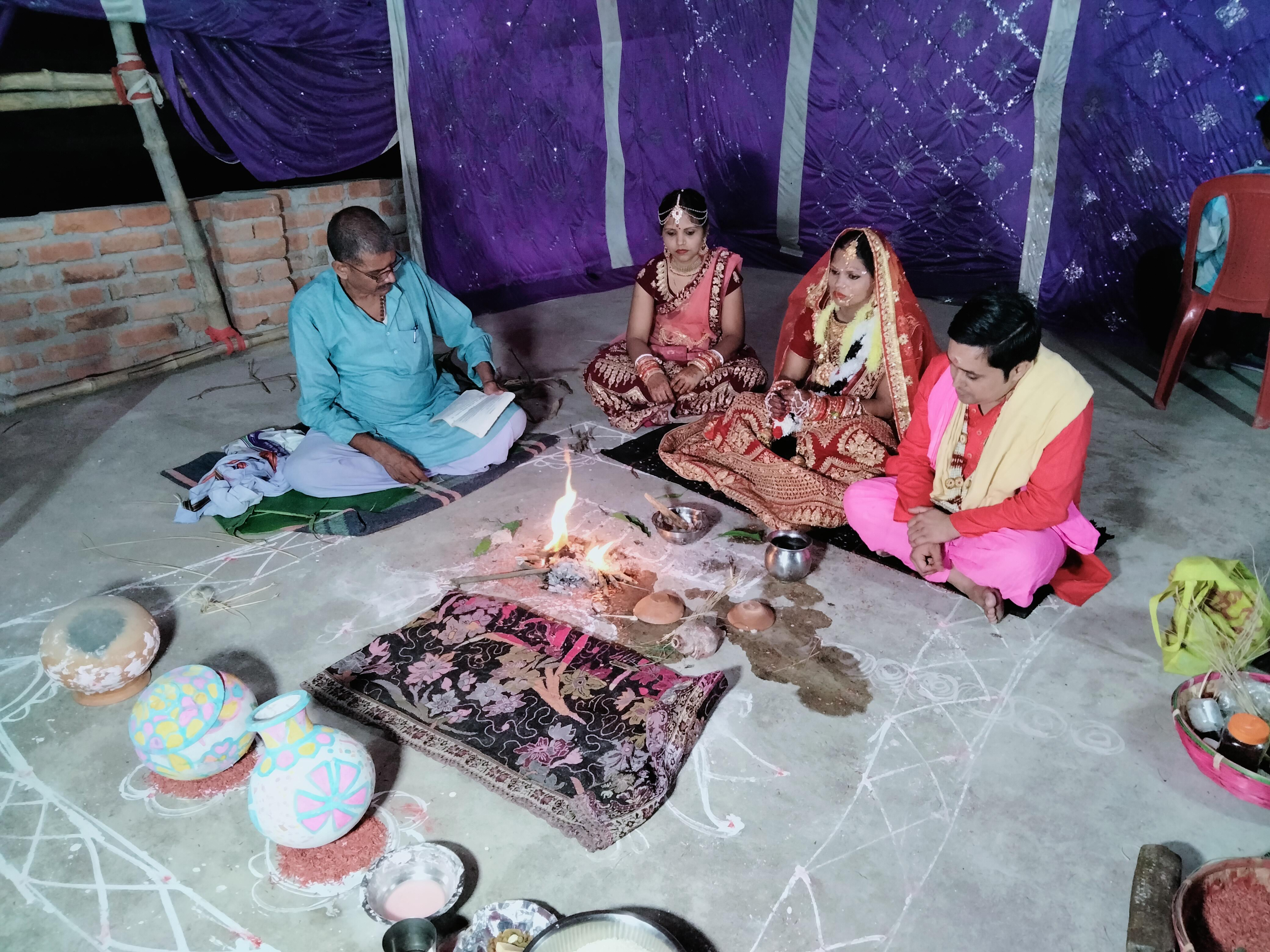
View of the Maithil Vivah at Basuki Bihari.

== Aspects ==
=== Conception ===
The ideal conception of marriage that was laid down by the ancient Indians is one in which it is a ceremonial gift of a bride (Vadhū) by her father, or another appropriate family member, to a bride-groom (Vara), so that they may fulfil the purposes of human existence together. In such a conception, vivaha, which originally meant the wedding ceremony, but has to acquire the definition of marriage as a whole, is meant for procreation, and the establishment of a family (kutumba). After one's wedding, one is believed to have entered the second stage of life, the grihastha ashrama, performing the duties of a householder.

=== Goals ===
In Hinduism, the four goals of life (Purusarthas) are regarded to be righteousness (dharma), wealth (artha), pleasure (kama), and liberation (moksha). Marriage is generally not considered necessary to fulfil these goals because following righteousness (dharma) applies to a person since birth and wealth (artha) and liberation (moksha) are again one's personal goal as dharma and need not to be aligned with marriage as they can be practiced with or without it. The three goals of marriage include allowing a husband and a wife to fulfil their dharma, bearing progeny (praja), and experiencing pleasure (rati). Sexual intercourse between a husband and wife is regarded to be important in order to produce children, but is the least desirable purpose of marriage in traditional Hindu schools of thought.

=== Age ===
The Naradasmirti states a daughter should be given away for once and all, as soon as her menses appear. The Manusmriti states that following menarche, a maiden may wait for three years, after which she may marry. Girls are usually considered to have achieved puberty when they are 12 years old, and are allowed to choose their own husbands if a suitable groom is not procured for them.

=== Gotra ===
While Hindu texts prescribe marrying within one's own community, they prohibit individuals from marrying those who belong to their own gotra, or lineage from the same Vedic sage:

One should not choose (the bride) from the same gotra or born in the line of same sage. (One may choose) from (descendants of) more than seven (generations) on the paternal side and more than five (generations) on the maternal side.

— Agni Purana, Chapter 154

=== Horoscope ===
The use of jatakam or janmakundali (natal and astrological chart at the time of birth) of one's son or daughter to arrange a marriage with the help of a priest is common, but not universal. Parents also take advice from Brahmin astrologers called 'Jothidar' in Tamil, 'Panthulu or Siddanthi' in Telugu, and Kundali Milan in Hindi, who holds astrological data of those individuals looking to get married. Some communities, like the Brahmins in Mithila, use genealogical records ("Panjikas") maintained by the specialists.

A jatakam or kundali chart is drawn based on the placement of the stars and planets at the time of one's birth. Those individuals who subscribe to Hindu astrology believe that the position of these celestial objects at the time of their birth, and their benefic or malefic influence, influence the auspicious compatibility between a bride and groom. For instance, the planet Venus is believed to be a benefic planet, and influential in terms of marriage. The maximum points for any match can be 36, and the minimum points for matching is 18. Any match with points under 18 is not considered as an auspicious match for a harmonious relationship, but they may still marry if they so choose. If the astrological chart of the two individuals (male and female) achieve the required threshold in points, then further talks are considered for a prospective marriage. The man and woman are given a chance to talk, and understand each other. If both parties consent, an auspicious time is chosen for the wedding to take place.

== Types of marriages ==
Nair Nambudiri Sambandam, a form of marriage in Hinduism from Kerala. Painting by Chithrakaran Murali.

Hindu texts, such as the Atharvaveda and the Manusmriti III.20-34, identify eight forms of marriage. They are traditionally presented, as here, in order of their religious appropriateness (prashasta). They also differ very widely in social acceptability.

While all of these marriages are recognised, not all have religious sanction; four of them are declared to be righteous, and the other four are stated to be non-righteous.

=== Brahma marriage ===
The Brahmavivaha is a righteous marriage. It refers to the marriage of one's daughter to a man of good conduct, learned in the Vedas, and invited by oneself. Brahma marriage is where a boy is able to get married once he has completed his education in the first stage of life, the Brahmacharya. Brahma marriage holds the supreme position of the eight types of Hindu matrimony. When the parents of a boy seek a suitable bride, they consider her family background, and the girl's father would ensure that his daughter's prospective groom is a scholar, one who is well-versed in the Vedas.

=== Daiva marriage ===
The Daivavivaha is a righteous marriage. It is a form of marriage unique to the ancient Brahmins, where a man gifts his richly bedecked daughter's hand in marriage to a priest who officiates at the former's sacrifice ceremony, in lieu of paying the latter a nominal sacrificial fee. This form of a marriage, ranked as the second most meritorious, is regarded to redeem the sins of seven generations of ancestors and descendants. It is named such because it is believed to be worthy of the devas themselves.

=== Arsha marriage ===
The Arshavivaha is a righteous marriage. It involves a man gifting his daughter as a bride, after receiving one or two pairs of cattle, a cow and a bull, from a groom, the exchange being perceived as a matter of the law, rather than the sale of the former's daughter. The sage Yajnavalkya prescribes offering one's maiden daughter as a bride in exchange for a pair of cows.

=== Prajapatya marriage ===
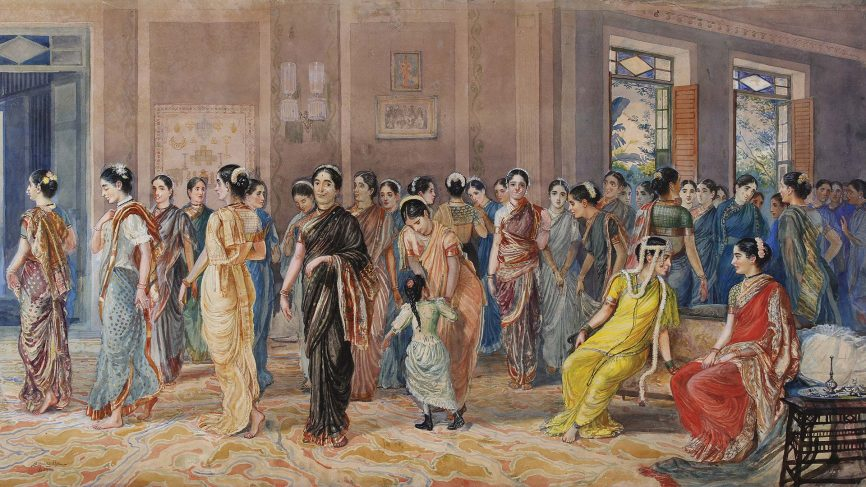
M.V. Dhurandhar’s depiction of a Hindu wedding ceremony

The Prajapatyavivaha is a righteous marriage. The girl's father gives her hand in marriage to a bridegroom, treating him with respect, and blessing them with the following words: 'May both of you perform together your religious duties' (Marathi: Hyā kanyēśīṃ dharmācēṃ ācaraṇa kara, or Prajōtpādanārtha kanyārpaṇa). In such a marriage, the bride's father goes in search of a groom, rather than the other way around, which makes it inferior to a Brahma marriage.

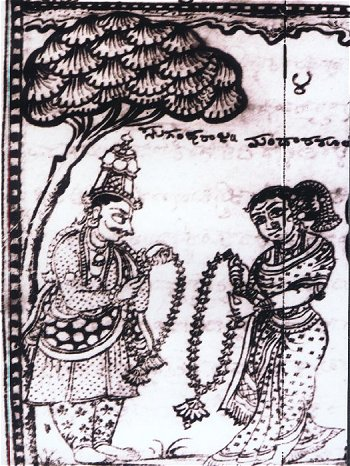
An eloping couple exchange garlands under a tree. Illustration from Sougandhika Parinaya

=== Gandharva marriage ===
The Gandharvavivaha is a form of righteous marriage based on the mutual consent from both partners. It is cohabitation that arises out of the mutual love shared between a youth and a maiden, where the primary purpose is sexual intercourse. No consultation of one's family members or the performance of ritual ceremonies takes place. The marriage of Dushyanta and Shakuntala is a historically celebrated example of such a marriage. It is generally considered to be permissible to the people of the Kshatriya, Vaishya and Shudra varnas according to Smriti texts, though it has become increasingly common among present-day Hindus due to the practice of dating and live-in relationships prior to marriage.

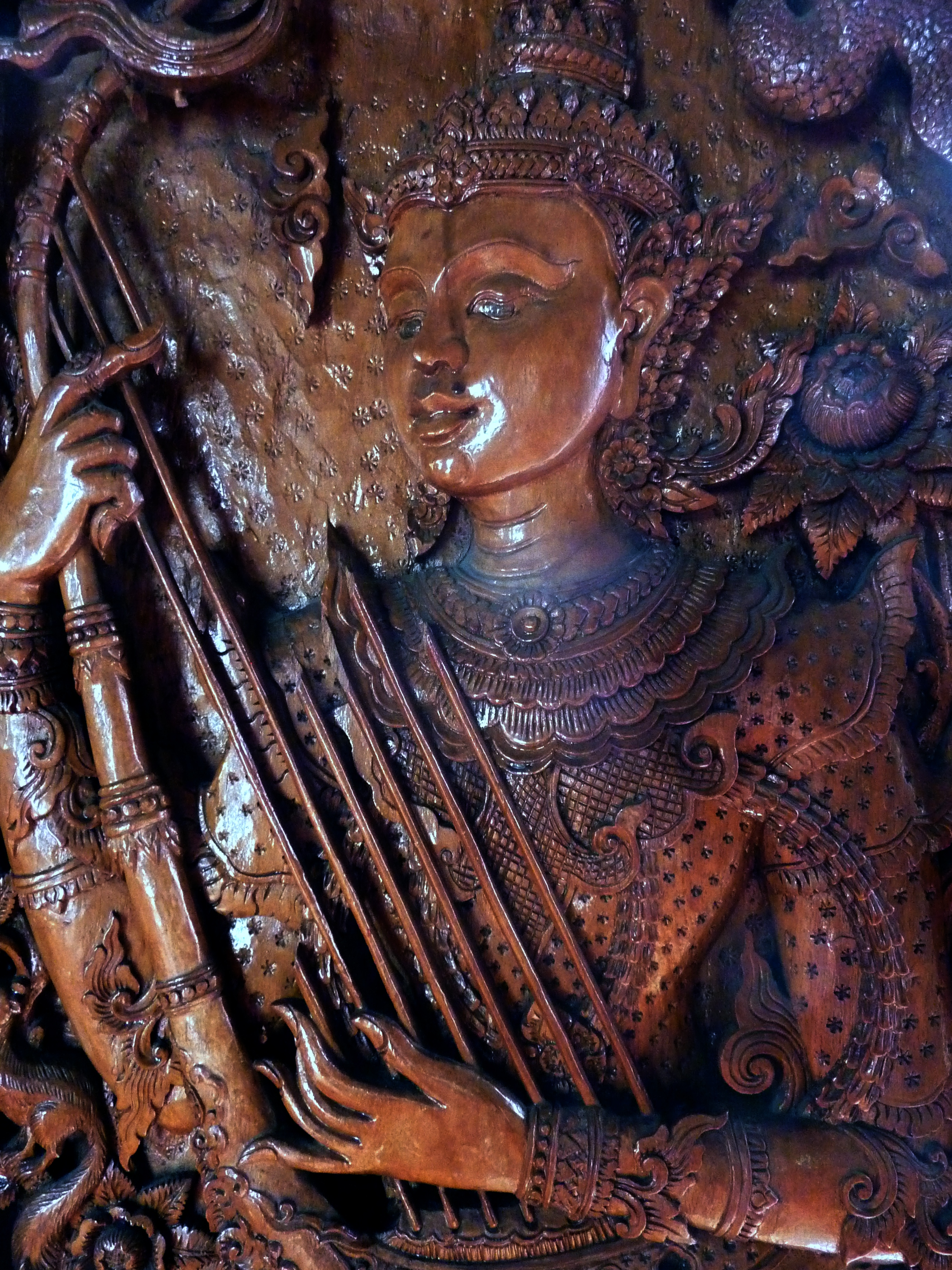
Gandharva in Thailand

=== Asura marriage ===
The Asuravivaha is a non-righteous form of marriage. It is a form of marriage where a bridegroom receives a maiden, after having given of his own free will as much wealth as he can afford, to the bride, and her kinsmen. As a form of marriage performed by paying a bride price, it is generally stated to be forbidden, though it is sometimes cited to be permissible for those of the Vaishya and Shudra varnas.

=== Rakshasa marriage ===
The Rakshasavivaha is a non-righteous form of marriage. It is the marriage performed after a non-consenting maiden is seized by force or abducted by a man. When such a maiden is abducted, she is described to weep as her relatives are assaulted and slain, and their house is wrecked. The marriage is then celebrated in the absence of the father of the bride by the family of her abductor. It is a reprehensible form of a marriage that is condemned by the Manusmriti, and is punished by law in the present-day.

=== Paishacha marriage ===
The Paishachavivaha is a non-righteous form of marriage. When a man stealthily rapes a woman who is asleep, intoxicated, or mentally challenged, it is regarded to be a marriage, though only to preserve the honour of the woman. This is condemned in the Manusmriti as a sinful act. In modern times, this is classified as a form of date rape, and is a crime in most countries.

James Lochtefeld comments that these last two forms were forbidden, but the marriages themselves were still recognised in ancient Hindu societies, not as condoning these acts, but rather to provide the woman and any resulting children with legal protection in the society.

=== Svayamvara ===
The Svayamvara is a type of wedding mentioned in Hindu mythology where a woman chose a man as her husband from a group of suitors. The bride would select an auspicious time and venue and then make known her intentions. Kings typically sent messengers to foreign lands, while commoners simply spread the news within the local community. On the appointed day, suitors would gather at the venue and declare their qualifications. The bride would place a garland on the man of her choice and a wedding ceremony was held immediately. However, this type of marriage is not attested to in any Dharmaśāstra.

== Conjugal forms ==
While most Hindus of the Indian subcontinent predominantly practise monogamy today, polygamous marriages have also characterised Hindu society for millennia.

=== Polygyny ===
Polygyny refers to a form of marriage where a man is married to more than one woman during the same period of time. While polygyny was not the norm of mainstream Hindu society, having more than one wife was a social custom that was believed to increase the prestige of a man. Members of royalty and aristocracy were often polygynous, and they were among the few who could afford to support more than one wife in their households. Polygyny was sanctioned by the Manusmriti among members of the dvija (twice-born) varnas: Brahmins were allowed to have up to four wives, Kshatriyas could have three wives, and the Vaishyas could have two wives; the Shudras, however, were permitted to have only one wife. The Apastamba Dharmasutra allows a man to take a new wife after ten years if his present wife was judged to be barren, and could marry after thirteen or fourteen years if his wife only produced daughters, and he desired a son. The Vasishtha Dharmsutra states a husband may take another wife if his wife engages in extramarital sex. Until the passage of the Hindu Marriage Act of 1955, every Hindu in India was theoretically allowed to have multiple wives.

=== Polyandry ===
Polyandry refers to a marriage where a woman is married to more than one man during the same period of time. This form of marriage has been exceedingly rare in Hindu society, and the Mahabharata's polyandrous marriage of Draupadi to the five Pandava brothers is the most cited example of this custom. The Mahabharata, however, does state that it is a great adharma for a woman to have multiple husbands. The Aitareya Brahmana prohibits a woman from having two husbands. The practice of polyandry has historically existed among the Nair community of Kerala, called Sambandam, though its practice is very rare in the modern period. The Todas of the Nilgiris, the Khasa of Dehradun, and a few communities of northern India are also cited to have been polyandrous. Polyandry is viewed with contempt in India today, a practice little removed from promiscuity on the part of a woman.

=== Monogamy ===
Monogamy refers to a marriage where a man is married to only one woman during a given period of time. Ever since the Vedic period, monogamy has been the dominant form of conjugal relationship and form of marriage in India. Monogamy is counselled to men by Vatsyayana, a philosopher and an authority of the Kama Sutra, with the belief that a man is only capable of physically, psychologically, and spiritually pleasing one woman at a time. Hindu texts that permit bigamy and polygyny recommend the monogamous marriage as the most appropriate form of the concept. It is exemplified in Hindu texts such as Ramayana, where Rama is believed to have taken the ekapatnivrata, literally meaning the, 'vow of one wife', the act of fidelity to one wife, Sita, and forbidding himself from engaging in sexual relations with other women.

== History ==
For most of Indian history, women were seen as subservient to the will of her father, and it was thought that unmarried women could not be kept at home – this belief is still held by some. It was – and in some places, still is – thought that one's daughter is only temporary, and that she is meant to be her husband's. The main duty of a girl's parents was, and is, regarded to arrange her marriage. After marriage, a woman is seen as a guest when visiting her natal home, and no longer a member of that family. In Hinduism, the main duty of a woman is serving her husband and family, and several Hindu festivals reflect this, by reinforcing the tradition of a woman fasting, or performing other rituals, to pray for her husband's long life. Dowry, the practice of the bride's family gifting property or money to her husband, is still prevalent despite the enactment of the Dowry Prohibition Act of 1961. Historically, if the amount of dowry was seen as insufficient, the groom's family would take it as an insult, and harass the new bride to ask her family for more dowry.

== Contemporary period ==
Many people believe that arranged marriage is the traditional form of marriage in India; however, the concept of love marriage has gained popularity as well, especially in urban areas. Love marriage differs from arranged marriage in that the couple, rather than the parents, choose their own partner, and that the consent of their parents is not asked for before marrying. The concept of a love marriage is not a novelty in India, as it is regarded to be the equivalent of the Gandharva marriage, which is still perceived as not righteous today. Hindu literature does indicate that love marriages were recognised and accepted in ancient times, for example, the legend of Dushyanta and Shakuntala in the Mahabharata. Somewhere in the course of time, arranged marriages became predominant, and love marriages became unacceptable or at least frowned upon.

Despite the rise in the count of Hindus marrying for love, arranged marriages still remain the norm: In a 2012 survey conducted by Ipsos for the TV channel NDTV, 74% of the respondents said that they preferred an arranged marriage. While the vast majority of Hindus continue to have arranged marriages, the prospective spouses usually have more agency in the match today than they did historically.

In a 2014 survey conducted by the United Nations Population Fund and International Center for Research on Women, 11.7% of men and 8.5% of women in India surveyed claimed that they chose their partners, and married with, or without, the consent of their families. The boundaries between the two types of marriage are believed to have started to blur. The term love-arranged marriage is used to describe an emerging form of marriage, which contains elements of both an arranged marriage and a love marriage. Love marriages are sometimes seen as imposition of the younger generation's will over the older generation's wishes.

=== Shuddhikaran ===
In India, when a Hindu and a non-Hindu marry under the Hindu Marriage Act and for the Hindu marriage to be valid, both partners must be Hindu amongst other conditions that also need to be fulfilled, and the non-Hindu partner must convert to Hinduism. A specific kind of ancient ritual is performed before the Hindu marriage called Shuddhikaran which is also practised by members of the Arya Samaj community who started the socio-political Shuddhi Movement that was derived from this ancient rite. The non-Hindu partner is converted to Hinduism through this purification rite before marrying, or else the marriage is regarded to be void, or not legally binding. The Hindu wedding ceremony that follows includes the vows and the ritual of circling the sacred fire four times; the completion of the fourth round binds the marriage. This is accepted as a complete, valid marriage in all states of India, and needs no registration with the exception of Goa, that is governed by a single code called Goa civil code, where the registration of marriage is made compulsory as it is accepted as the only proof of marriage.

== Same-sex marriage ==
According to the Pew Research Centre, though many modern Hindus condemn same-sex marriage, others cite ancient Hindu texts, such as the Kama Sutra, that seem to condone homosexual behavior.

In some Buddhist-Hindu cultures, marriage was considered to be a secular issue not sanctioned by religion. There is widespread evidence of same-sex cohabitation in the Kandyan kingdom (15th century to 19th century) due to tolerance of "eating together" (i.e. living together in the same house and sharing the same means), though it is argued that this is not of a homosexual nature but rather of a fraternal nature. Marriage among the Sinhalese, though serving an important social role, was traditionally marked by informal customs and family approval rather than elaborate rituals. Cohabitation was widespread with marriage being considered a by-product of successful cohabitation, which is in-line with Buddhist views of the secular concept of marriage. Cohabitation as an unmarried couple in Sri Lanka became a punishable offence from the Dutch colonial period in 1580. Andi Fein argued that prohibitions against homosexual marriage in Chinese Buddhism stem from Confucianism, and that studies of Buddhism and Hinduism in India and Sri Lanka show no such prohibitions existed there. There have been reports of Hindu gurus performing same-sex marriages in India since at least the 1980s.

== See also ==
- Hindu wedding
- Pativrata
- Buddhist view of marriage
- Weddings in India
- Shuddhikaran
- Shuddhi (Hinduism)
- Interfaith marriage
- Jewish views on marriage
- Christian views on marriage
- Marriage in Islam
