= Paishacha marriage =

Form of marriage mentioned in Hindu texts

The Paishacha marriage (Sanskrit: पैशाचविवाह, romanized: Paiśāchavivāha) is a non-righteous form of marriage described in Hindu literature. When a man stealthily rapes a woman who is asleep, intoxicated, or mentally challenged, it is regarded as a marriage, though only to preserve the honour of the woman.

This is condemned in the Manusmriti as a sinful act. In modern times, this is classified as a form of date rape, and is a crime in most countries.
