= Brahma marriage =

Form of marriage in Hinduism described in Hindu texts

The Brahma marriage (Sanskrit: ब्राह्मविवाह, romanized: Brāhmavivāha) is a righteous form of marriage described in Hindu texts. It refers to the marriage of one's daughter to a man of good conduct, learned in the Vedas, and invited by oneself. Originally intended only for the Brahmins, a Brahma marriage is where a boy is able to get married once he has completed his education in the first stage of life, the Brahmacharya. Brahma marriage holds the supreme position of the eight types of Hindu matrimony. When the parents of a boy seek a suitable bride, they consider her family background, and the girl's father would ensure that his daughter's prospective groom is a scholar, one who is well-versed in the Vedas. This form of marriage is described in the Manusmriti.

== Description ==
This form of marriage held that the son born of a marriage redeems the sins of ten generations of ancestors, ten generations of descendants, and himself. In the Mahabharata, it is found that the Kshatriyas practiced the Brahma vivaha, although as suggested by its name, it was mostly practiced by Brahmins.

The Brahma marriage is most common type of arranged marriage among Hindus nowadays, wherein the father of a girl (bride) marries her to a man (groom) deemed to be of good conduct.
