= Daiva marriage =

Form of marriage described in Hindu texts

The Daiva marriage (Sanskrit: दैवविवाह, romanized: Daivavivāha) is a righteous form of marriage. It is a form of marriage unique to the ancient Brahmins, where a man gifts his richly bedecked daughter's hand in marriage to a priest who officiates at the former's sacrifice ceremony, in lieu of paying the latter a nominal sacrificial fee. This form of a marriage, ranked as the second most meritorious, is regarded to redeem the sins of seven ascendants and descendants. It is called such because it is believed to be worthy of the devas themselves. It is featured in the Manusmriti.

== Examples ==
The practice was followed by many royals in ancient times to forge diplomatic ties with allies and enemies (after getting defeated) alike by giving away their daughters can also be considered as this type of marriage. Giving away of Uttara by her father, the king Virata of Matsya to Arjuna as his daughter-in-law is one such example.
