= Bride burning =

Form of domestic violence

Bride burning is a form of torture murder practiced in and around the Indian subcontinent. A form of dowry death, bride-burning occurs when a woman is murdered by her husband or his family for her family's refusal to pay additional dowry. The wife is typically doused with kerosene, gasoline, or other flammable liquid, and set alight, leading to death by burning. Kerosene is often used as the cooking fuel for small petrol stoves, some of which are dangerous, so it allows the claim that the crime was an accident.

In 2004, bride burning was recognized as an important problem in India. In 1995, Time magazine reported that dowry deaths in India increased from around 400 a year in the early 1980s to around 5,800 a year by the middle of the 1990s. According to Indian National Crime Record Bureau, there were 1,948 convictions and 3,876 acquittals in dowry death cases in 2008.

== History ==
=== Dowry deaths ===
A dowry death is the death of a young woman in South Asian countries, primarily India, who is murdered or driven to suicide by her husband. This results from the husband or his family continually attempting to extract more dowry from the bride or her family. Bride burning is just one form of dowry death; acid throwing, poisoning and other forms of fatal violence also occur. Because dowry typically depends on class or socioeconomic status, women are often subjected to the dowry pressures of their future husband or his relatives.

=== Origins of bride burning ===
There are at least four perspectives on why bride burning came to be and how its existence has prevailed in South Asian nations, as detailed by Avnita Lakhani in her report on bride burning titled "The Elephant in the Room Is Out of Control". These theories describe practices that contributed to the rise of dowry as a whole, thus ultimately contributing to bride burning.

One of the more culturally-founded theories suggests that in a highly patriarchal society such as India, a woman's role is defined from before she is born, which ultimately places her as lesser than men. Because she is seen as a burden and an "extra mouth to feed", her status as an economic liability promotes the idea that men, who are considered physical assets, can treat women as subservient. Once a woman marries, she is bound to her husband and his will because "society mandates obedience to her husband".

Another theory claims that consumerism has caused countries like India to become greedy. Because of this, dowry is used as a means to gain a higher socioeconomic status. As status is continually gained, the demand for bridal dowry increases in order to keep moving up the social ladder.

Lakhani also suggests that historically speaking, the dowry system may have been conceived as a way to distinguish Muslim from Hindu culture, creating a further divide within castes. A higher dowry would indicate a higher status and distinction from Islam, thus providing an incentive to demand a larger dowry.

Finally, some scholars argue that the dowry practice came out of British rule and influence in India to distinguish "different forms of marriage" between castes. When the dowry system was established within the higher castes, the British government sought to reinforce it in the lower castes as a means to eradicate their more ritualised marriages. Such forms of union were discredited until only upper-caste marriage systems were recognised.

== South Asians ==
=== In India ===
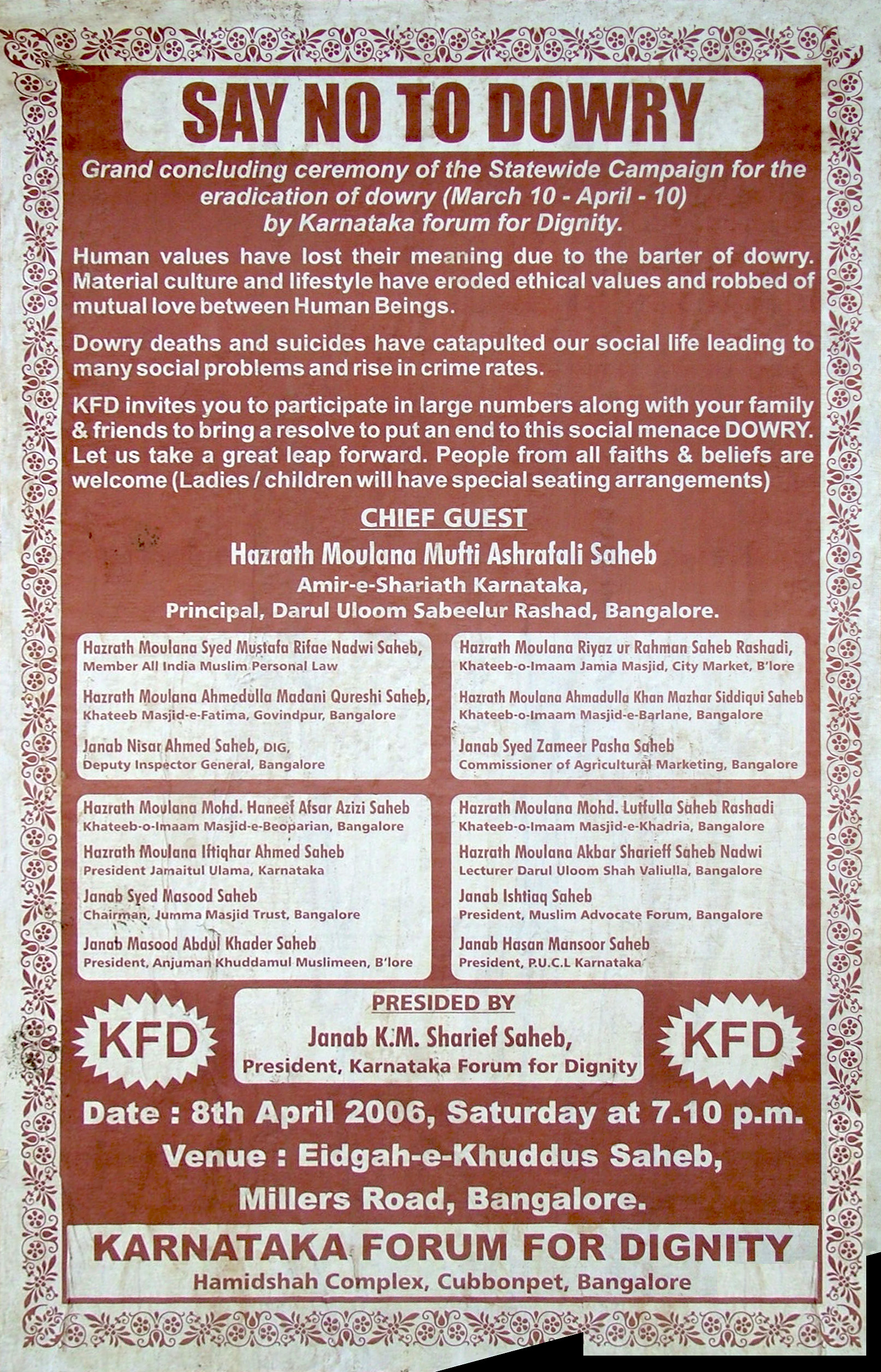
A Muslim organization Karnataka Forum for Dignity's poster against Dowry system in Bangalore, India

Ashley K. Jutla and David Heimbach describe bride burning by saying that "the husband and/or in-laws have determined that the dowry, a gift given from the daughter's parents to the husband, was inadequate and therefore attempt to murder the new bride to make the husband available to remarry or to punish the bride and her family." In India, dowry size is a reflection of wealth. The Indian author Rajesh Talwar has written a play on dowry deaths titled The Bride Who Would Not Burn.

In 1961, the government of India passed the Dowry Prohibition Act, making the dowry demands in wedding arrangements illegal.

In 1986, the Indian Parliament added dowry deaths as a new domestic violence crime. According to the new section 304-B of the Indian Penal Code, where a bride "within 7 years of her marriage is killed and it is shown that soon before her death, she was subjected to cruelty or harassment by her husband, or any relative of her husband, or in connection with any demand for dowry, such death shall be called 'dowry death' and such husband or relative shall be deemed to have caused her death."

The offenders can be sentenced for any period, from a minimum of seven years in prison to a maximum of life. Many cases of dowry-related domestic violence, suicides, and murders have been reported. A 1997 report claimed that at least 5000 women die each year because of dowry deaths and at least a dozen die each day in 'kitchen fires' thought to be intentional. About 30 percent of reported dowry deaths result in convictions in courts.

=== In Pakistan ===
In Pakistan, the Progressive Women's Association says that 300 women are burned to death each year by their husband's families and that bride burning incidents are sometimes disguised as accidents, such as an 'exploding stove'. According to the Association, doctors say that victims presenting from these accidents have injuries inconsistent with stove burns. According to an Amnesty International report in 1999, although 1600 bride burning incidents were reported, only 60 were prosecuted and, of those, only two resulted in convictions.

In Pakistan, women including Shahnaz Bukhari have been campaigning for protective legislation against the practice, for established women's shelters and for hospitals with specialised burn wards. Amnesty International has said that pressure from within, as well as from international human rights groups, may be increasing the level of awareness within the Pakistani government. The BBC estimated that roughly 300 Pakistani brides were burnt to death in 1999.

In 1988, a survey showed that 800 women were killed in this manner; in 1989, the number rose to 1100, and in 1990 it stood at 1800 estimated killings. Newspapers in Lahore in a six-month period (1997) reported on average 15 attacks a month. According to an estimate by Human Development in South Asia, on average there are 16 cases of bride burnings a month. Women's eNews reported 4000 women attacked in this manner in Islamabad's surroundings over an eight-year period and that the average age range of victims is between 18 and 35 with an estimated 30 percent being pregnant at the time of death. Shahnaz Bukhari has said of such attacks:

Either Pakistan is home to possessed stoves which burn only young housewives, and are particularly fond of genitalia, or looking at the frequency with which these incidences occur there is a grim pattern that these women are victims of deliberate murder.

According to the Progressive Women's Association such attacks are a growing problem and in 1994 on International Women's Day announced that various NGOs would join to raise awareness of the issue. One woman is killed every hour in Pakistan as a form of domestic violence, a practice known as bride burning, a category of dowry murder, resulting in possibly one of the most gruesome deaths, burning alive.

=== In other nations ===
Occasionally, bride burning happens among resettled Indian, Pakistani and Bangladeshi communities in other parts of the world, such as the United States.

Aleyamma Mathew was a registered nurse at a hospital in Carrollton, Texas, who died of burn wounds on 5 April 1992. She and her husband, Mathew Varughese, had immigrated from India two decades before and had three daughters in the United States. The couple had been having marital problems since the late 1980s, which culminated in a fight that led to Aleyamma's death. She was found by her children, doused in gasoline and covered in flames, dying soon after.

Brief articles were run in The Dallas Morning News and The Atlanta Journal-Constitution after the incident, while the Dallas Observer ran a detailed, nine-page article covering Aleyamma's death. The article faced some criticism for its portrayal of non-Western countries as backward or inappropriate: "Battered by her husband, Aleyamma Mathew remained true to her culture. In the end she became its victim."

== Controlling bride burning ==
There are current governmental initiatives to criminalize bride burning and grassroots organizations working to combat the practice, as well as international laws working against human rights violations. Finally, there are many proposed initiatives in place to end bride burning globally.

=== Governmental efforts ===
In 1961, India enacted the Dowry Prohibition Act, to halt dowry murders. It was amended in the early 1980s to "rectify several inherent weaknesses and loopholes" in order to make it a criminal offense if the husband or his relatives causes a woman to "die of burns or bodily injury or unnatural circumstances within seven years of the marriage and where there is evidence that she suffered cruelty and harassment in connection with the dowry." This law, however, does not provide a comprehensive definition of dowry, which can change the way it is demanded and delivered. Ultimately, this allowed perpetrators more flexibility in the court of dowry death. The seven-year clause is equally problematic, as it simply allowed husbands to wait until that period ended to burn or otherwise cause the death of their bride.

Another major Indian law, the 1983 "Anti-Cruelty Statute", prohibits cruelty towards a wife and subjects the husband and/or in-laws to fines or imprisonment if they inflict cruelty upon the wife. However, the law is equally ambiguous, which results in inadequate enforcement of bride burning and dowry murders.

Article 1 of the Universal Declaration of Human Rights declares the following: "All human beings are born free and equal in dignity and rights. They are endowed with reason and conscience and should act towards one another in a spirit of brotherhood". Article 5 proclaims: "No one shall be subjected to torture or to cruel, inhuman or degrading treatment or punishment."

=== Non-governmental efforts ===
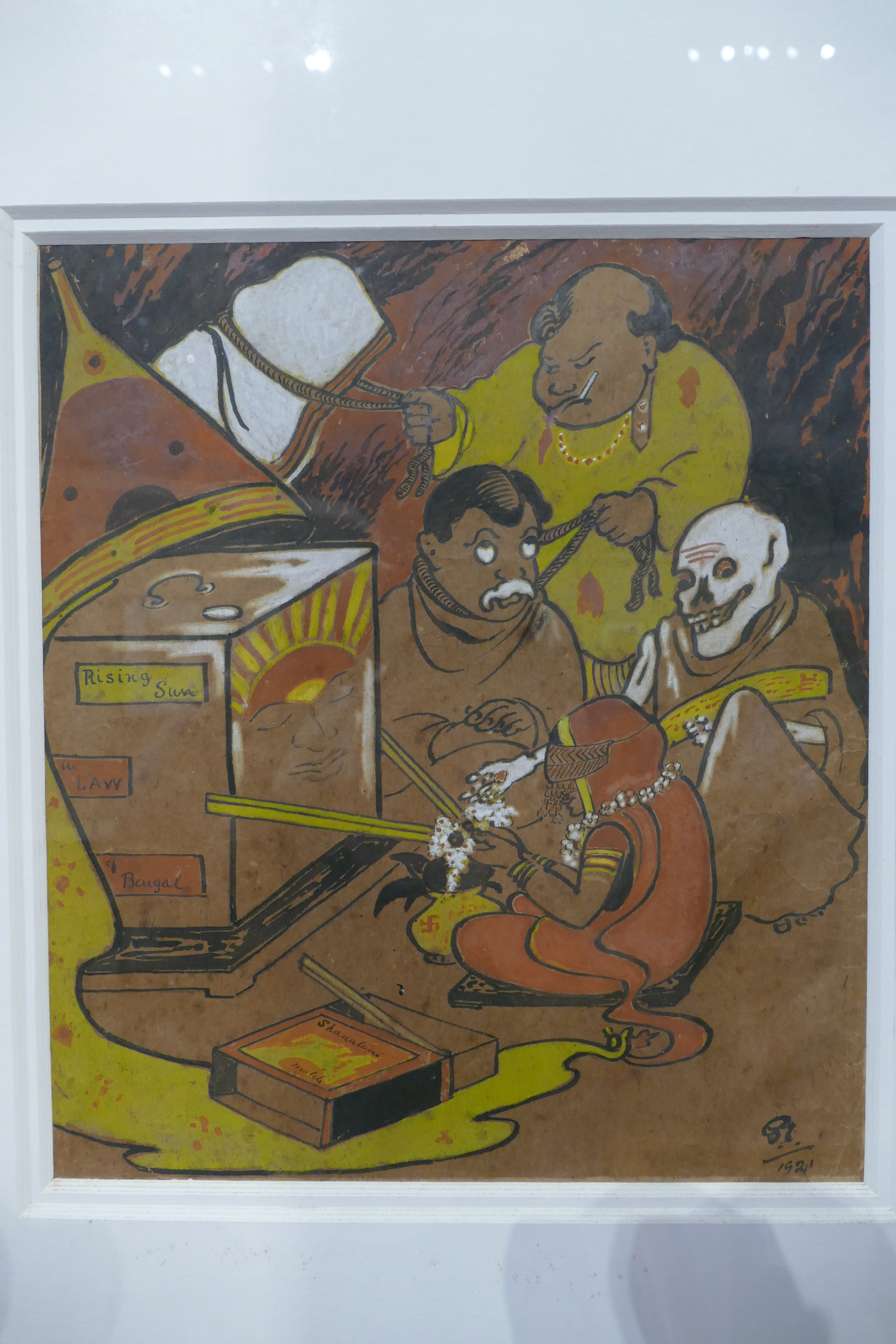
Rising Sun-in-law of Bengal, painting by Gaganendranath Tagore (d. 1938).

In India, where most cases of bride burning are seen, domestic legislation is typically inadequately enforced. Because of this, grassroots organizations "have taken up the cause to halt bride burning". One example of this is government-funded family counseling center cells, in which the intended goal is to strengthen family ties and reduce legal intervention. However, often such cells only reinforce the stereotype of "women's sharp tongues" and men's power to "hit and beat". Other similar counseling-style NGOs have been developed in order to resolve such issues with similar consequences.

=== Potential efforts ===
Primarily, alternative initiatives resolve around reform of current flawed, failing laws. One proposal calls for the expansion of the protection for women under the international refugee law in order to provide asylum to victims of gender discrimination or gendercide. One way this could be achieved would be by including women in the definition of a "persecuted social group", which would allow their gender to seek international asylum under fear of dowry-related persecution globally.

In April 1984, European Parliament introduced a proposal that would "protect women from persecution on the basis of gender" by reforming international refugee laws. However, the proposal was rejected.

Another solution is to increase economic interest for women by establishing their property rights. Even when married, the bride has no rights over the property belonging to the husband while he is living. In giving women the right to own property, women would not need to marry for economic or legal purposes, thus disregarding the dowry practice.

== See also ==
- Acid throwing
- Caste system
- Domestic violence in India
- Dowry
- Dowry death
- Female infanticide
- Femicide
- Fire, a Canadian-Indian movie with bride-burning as one of the themes
- Gendercide
- Sati
- Sexism in India
- Violence against women
- Watta satta
- Women in India and Women in Pakistan and Women in Bangladesh
