= Combustibility and flammability =

Ability to easily ignite in air at ambient temperatures

The international pictogram for flammable chemicals

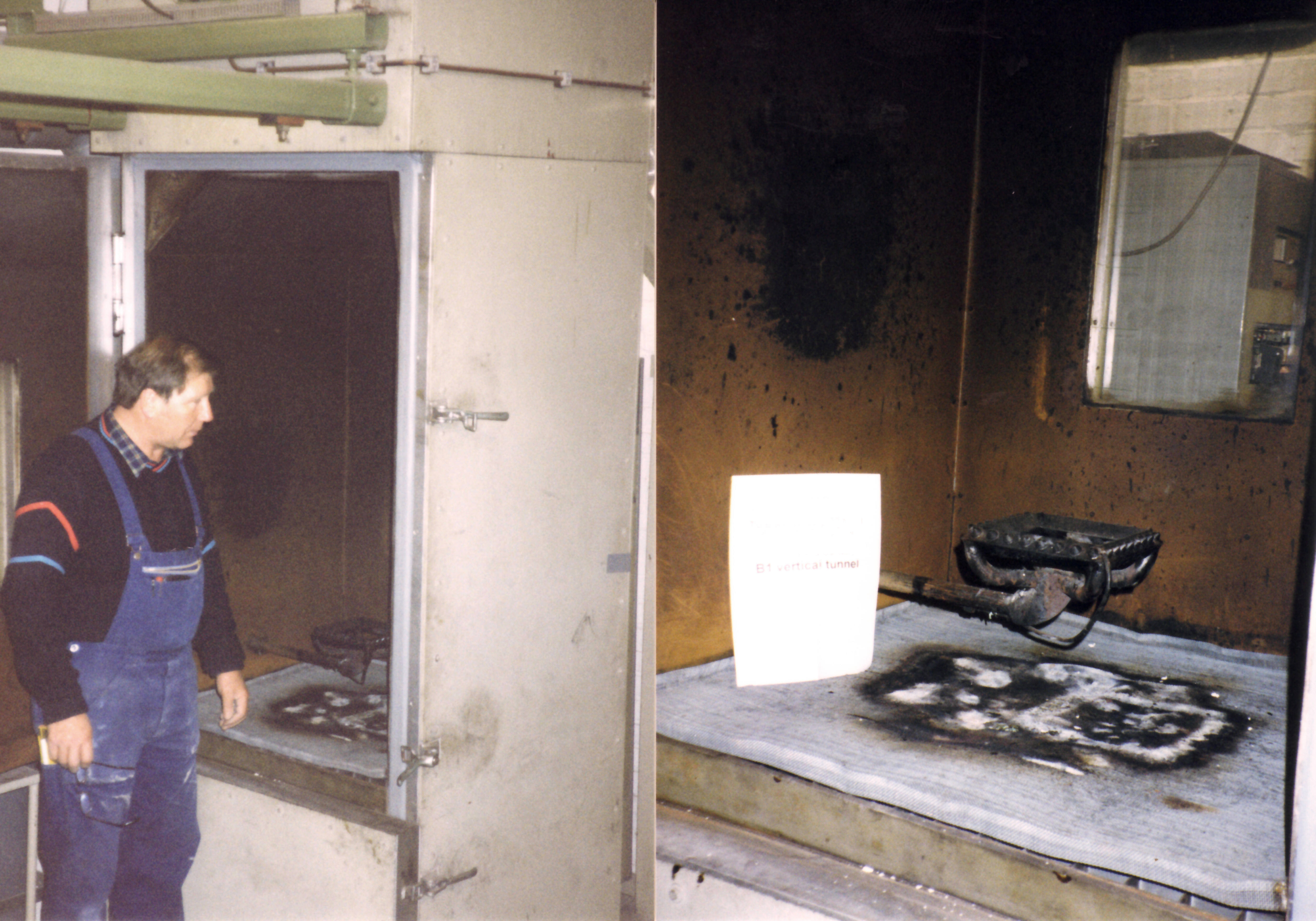
DIN4102 flammability class B1 vertical shaft furnace at Technische Universität Braunschweig, Germany

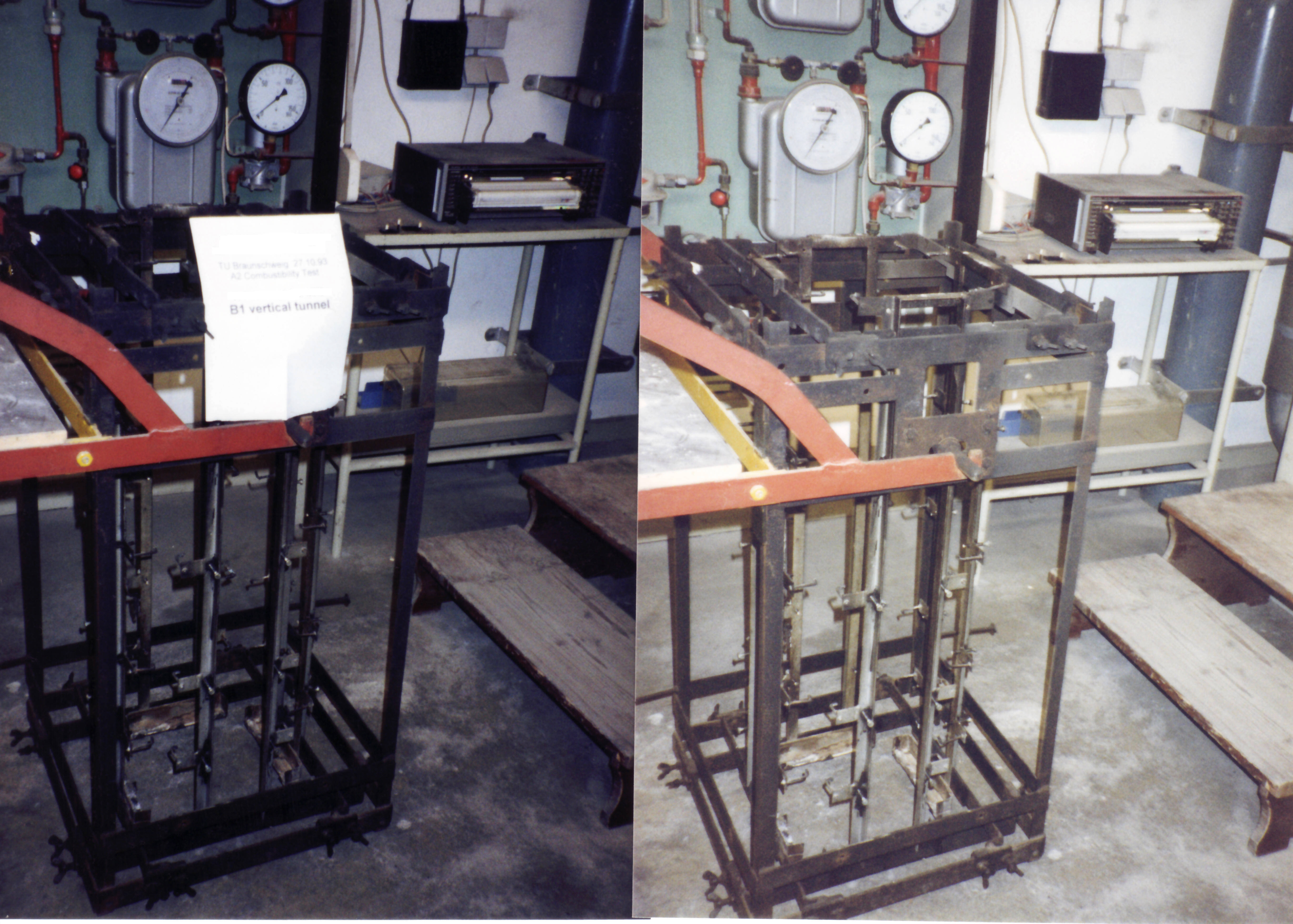
Sample holder for DIN4102 flammability class B1 vertical shaft furnace

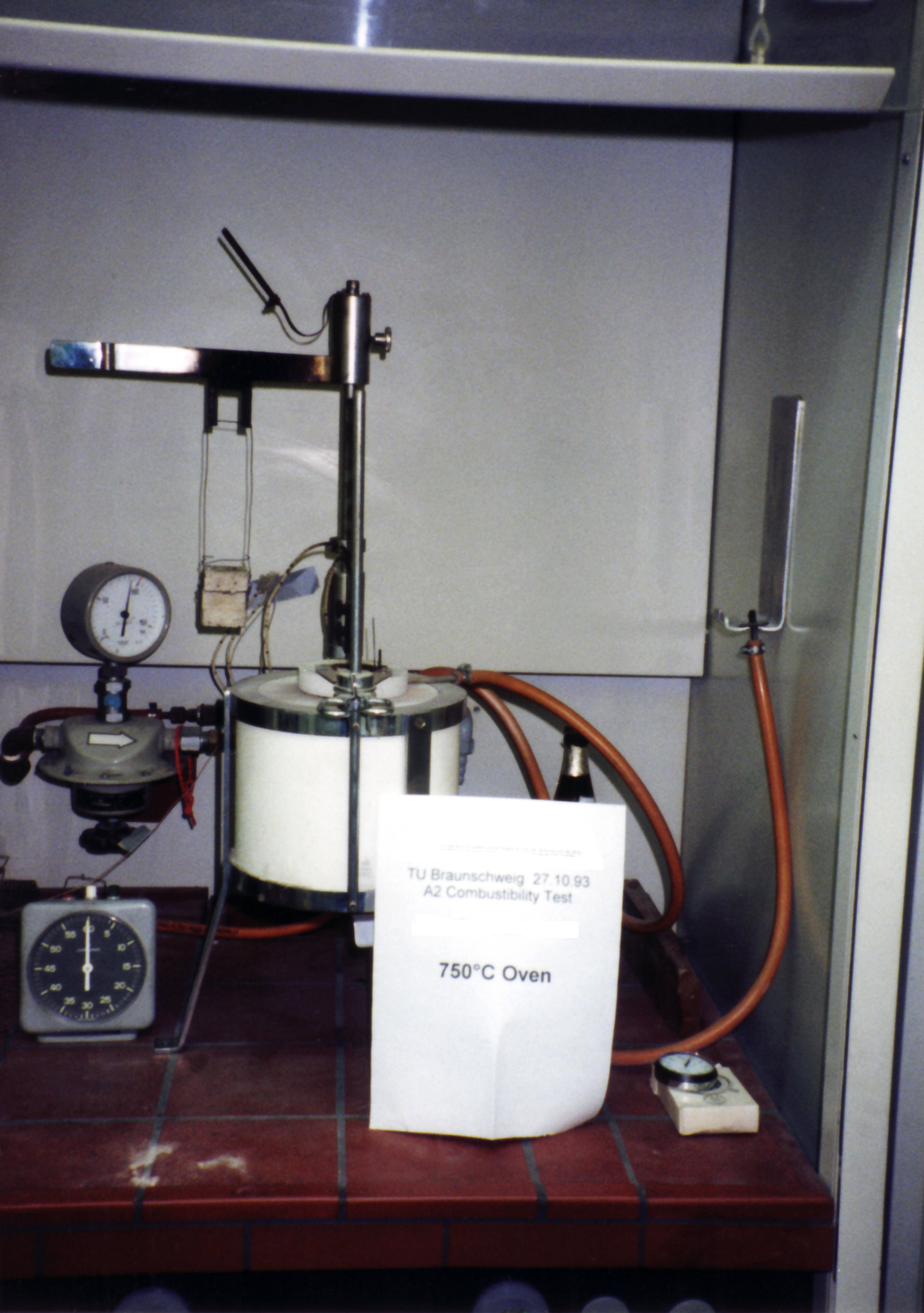
Test apparatus for determining combustibility at Technische Universität Braunschweig

A combustible material is a material that can burn (i.e. sustain a flame) in air under certain conditions. A material is flammable or inflammable if it ignites easily at room temperature. In other words, a combustible material takes more effort to ignite and a flammable material ignites almost immediately when exposed to a flame.

The degree of flammability in air depends largely on how easy the material vaporizes. This is related to its composition-specific vapor pressure, which is temperature dependent. The quantity of vapor produced can be enhanced by increasing the surface area of the material, forming a mist or dust. Wood is an example. Finely divided wood dust can undergo explosive flames and produce a blast wave. A piece of paper (made from pulp) catches on fire quite easily. A heavy oak desk is much harder to ignite, even though the wood fibers are the same in all three materials.

Common sense, and scientific consensus until the mid-1700s, suggests that material disappears when burned, as only the ash is left. Further scientific research has found that conservation of mass holds for chemical reactions. The burning of a solid material may appear to lose mass if the mass of combustion gases (such as carbon dioxide and water vapor) is not taken into account. The original mass of flammable material and the mass of the oxygen consumed (from the surrounding air) equals the mass of the flame products (ash, water, carbon dioxide, and other gases). Some metals gain mass when they burn to support the idea (because those chemical reactions capture oxygen atoms into solid compounds rather than gaseous water).

== Definitions ==
Historically, flammable, inflammable and combustible meant capable of burning. The word "inflammable" came through French from the Latin inflammāre = "to set fire to", where the Latin preposition "in-" means "in" as in "indoctrinate", rather than "not" as in "invisible" and "ineligible".

The word inflammable may be erroneously thought to mean non-flammable. The erroneous usage of the word inflammable is a significant safety hazard. Therefore, since the 1950s, efforts to use flammable in place of inflammable were accepted by linguists, and it is now the accepted standard in American English and British English. Antonyms of flammable or inflammable include: non-flammable, non-inflammable, incombustible, non-combustible, not flammable, and fireproof.

Flammable applies to combustible materials that ignite easily and thus are more dangerous and more highly regulated. Less easily ignited and less-vigorously burning materials are combustible. For example, in the United States flammable liquids, by definition, have a flash point below 100 °F (38 °C). Combustible liquids have a flash point above 100 °F (38 °C). Flammable solids are solids that are readily combustible, may cause, or contribute to fire through friction. Readily combustible solids are powdered, granular, or pasty substances that easily ignite by brief contact with an ignition source, such as a burning match, and spread flame rapidly. The technical definitions vary between countries so the United Nations created the Globally Harmonized System of Classification and Labeling of Chemicals, which defines the flash point temperature of flammable liquids as between 0 and 140 °F (60 °C) and combustible liquids between 140 °F (60 °C) and 200 °F (93 °C).

== Flammability ==
Flammability is the ease with which a combustible substance can be ignited causing fire, combustion, or an explosion. The degree of difficulty required to cause the combustion of a substance is quantified through fire testing. A variety of test protocols exist to quantify flammability. The ratings achieved are used in building codes, insurance requirements, fire codes, and other regulations that govern the use of building materials as well as the storage and handling of highly flammable substances. This includes inside and outside of structures and in surface and air transportation. For instance, changing an occupancy by altering the flammability of the contents requires the owner of a building to apply for a building permit to make sure that the overall fire protection design of the facility takes the change into account.

=== Classification of flammability ===
Globally Harmonized System of Classification and Labelling of Chemicals uses a four category system to classify flammable liquids using flash point and boiling point temperature. This system is used internationally to evaluate and sort substances in industrial applications, workplaces and products distributed to consumers.

GHS Classification of flammable liquids
Category	Category 1	Category 2	Category 3	Category 4
Flash point	<23.0 °C (73.4 °F)	<23.0 °C (73.4 °F)	≥23.0 °C (73.4 °F) - ≤60 °C (140 °F)	>60 °C (140 °F) - ≤93.0 °C (199.4 °F)
Boiling point	≤35 °C (95 °F)	>35 °C (95 °F)	—N/a	—N/a
Example liquids	Gasoline (Petrol), Diethyl ether	Ethanol, Isopropyl alcohol	Kerosene, 1-Butanol	Diesel fuel, Formic acid
GHS signal word and hazard statement	Danger - Extremely flammable liquid and vapor	Danger - Highly flammable liquid and vapor	Warning - Flammable liquid and vapor	Warning - Combustible liquid

Prior to 2012, OSHA's classification of flammable and combustible liquids in regulation CFR 1910.106, was nearly identical to the National Fire Protection Association (NFPA) Flammable and Combustible Liquids Code, NFPA 30. (Note: OSHA regulations excluded liquids with a flashpoint above 200 °F (93 °C), (Class III-B), specifically noting that any reference to "Class III liquids" was to be understood as only describing Class III-A liquids.) While no longer used for occupational regulations, NFPA 30's definitions are still commonly used in fire codes and NFPA codes and standards.

NFPA 30 - Flammable and Combustible Liquids Code
Class	I-A	I-B	I-C	II	III-A	III-B
	Flammable			Combustible		
Flash point	<22.8 °C (73.0 °F)	<22.8 °C (73.0 °F)	≥22.8 °C (73.0 °F) - <37.8 °C (100.0 °F)	≥37.8 °C (100.0 °F) - ≤60 °C (140 °F)	≥60 °C (140 °F) - <200 °F (93 °C)	≥200 °F (93 °C)
Boiling point	<37.8 °C (100.0 °F)	≥37.8 °C (100.0 °F)	—N/a	—N/a	—N/a	—N/a
Example liquids	Gasoline (Petrol), Diethyl ether	Ethanol, Isopropyl alcohol	Butyl alcohol, Turpentine	Diesel fuel, Mineral spirits	Fuel oil, Formic acid	Olive oil, oil based paints

Other systems for classifications of flammable liquids exist for more specialized applications, such as NFPA 704, which uses five categories. This is intended for emergency workers to understand the hazard posed by a substance during an emergency, such as a spill. In addition to GHS, flammability classifications are incorporated into various systems designed for communicating physical and health hazards in workplaces; such as the American Coatings Association's Hazardous Materials Identification System (HMIS)

=== Examples of flammable substances ===
Flammable substances include, but are not limited to:

- Gasoline - Petrol / a complicated mixture of hydrocarbons that includes isomers of octane, C_{8}H_{18}
- Ethanol / CH_{3}CH_{2}OH
- Rubber
- Isopropyl alcohol / CH_{3}CH(OH)CH_{3}
- Methanol / CH_{3}OH
- Wood
- Acetone / CH_{3}COCH_{3}
- Paper
- Nitromethane / CH_{3}NO_{2}

=== Examples of nonflammable substances ===
- Water
- Carbon tetrachloride
- Iron
- Ceramic

=== Furniture flammability ===
Flammability of furniture is of concern as cigarettes and candle accidents can trigger domestic fires. In 1975, California began implementing Technical Bulletin 117 (TB 117), which required that materials such as polyurethane foam used to fill furniture be able to withstand a small open flame, equivalent to a candle, for at least 12 seconds. In polyurethane foam, furniture manufacturers typically meet TB 117 with additive halogenated organic flame retardants. No other U.S. states had similar standards. California had such a large market, manufacturers meet TB 117 in products that they distribute across the United States. The proliferation of flame retardants, especially halogenated organic flame retardants, in furniture across the United States is strongly linked to TB 117. When it became apparent that the risk-benefit ratio of this approach was unfavorable and the industry had used falsified documentation (i.e. see David Heimbach) for the use of flame retardants, California modified TB 117 to require that fabric covering upholstered furniture meet a smolder test that replaced the open flame test. Governor Jerry Brown signed the modified TB117-2013, which became effective in 2014.

=== Fabric flammability ===
Lightweight textiles with porous surfaces are the most flammable fabrics. Wool is less flammable than cotton, linen, silk, or viscose (rayon). Polyester and nylon resist ignition and melt rather than catch fire. Acrylic is the most flammable synthetic fiber.

=== Testing ===
A fire test can be conducted to determine the degree of flammability. Test standards used to make this determination but are not limited to the following:

- Underwriters Laboratories UL 94 Flammability Testing
- International Electrotechnical Commission IEC 60707, 60695-11-10 and 60695-11-20
- International Organization for Standardization ISO 9772 and 9773.
- National Fire Protection Association NFPA 287 Standard Test Methods for Measurement of Flammability of Materials in Cleanrooms Using a Fire Propagation Apparatus (FPA)
- NFPA 701: Standard Methods of Fire Tests for Flame Propagation of Textiles and Films
- NFPA 850: Recommended Practice for Fire Protection for Electric Generating Plants and High Voltage Direct Current Converter Stations

== Combustibility ==
Combustibility is a measure of how easily a substance bursts into flame, through fire or combustion. This is an important property to consider when a substance is used for construction or is being stored. It is also important in processes that produce combustible substances as a by-product. Special precautions are usually required for substances that are easily combustible. These measures may include installation of fire sprinklers or storage remote from possible sources of ignition.

Substances with low combustibility may be selected for construction where the fire risk must be reduced, such as apartment buildings, houses, or offices. If combustible resources are used there is greater chance of fire accidents and deaths. Fire resistant substances are preferred for building materials and furnishings.

=== Non-combustible material ===
A non-combustible material is a substance that does not ignite, burn, support combustion, or release flammable vapors when subject to fire or heat. Any solid substance complying with either of two sets of passing criteria, listed in Section 8 of ASTM E 136 when the substance is tested in accordance with the procedure specified in ASTM E 136, is considered to be non-combustible.

=== Combustible dust ===
A number of industrial processes produce combustible dust as a by-product. The most common is wood dust. Combustible dust has been defined by OSHA as: a solid material composed of distinct particles or pieces, regardless of size, shape, or chemical composition, which presents a fire or deflagration hazard when suspended in air or some other oxidizing medium over a range of concentrations. In addition to wood, combustible dusts include metals, specifically magnesium, titanium, and aluminum, as well as other carbon-based dusts. There are at least 140 known substances that produce combustible dust. While the particles in a combustible dusts may be of any size, normally they have a diameter of less than 420 μm. (Note: I.e. they can pass through a U.S. No. 40 standard sieve.) As of 2012, the United States Occupational Safety and Health Administration has yet to adopt a comprehensive set of rules on combustible dust.

When suspended in air (or any oxidizing environment), the fine particles of combustible dust present a potential for explosions. Accumulated dust, even when not suspended in air, remains a fire hazard. The National Fire Protection Association (U.S.) specifically addresses the prevention of fires and dust explosions in agricultural and food products facilities in NFPA Code section 61, and other industries in NFPA Code sections 651–664. (Note: E.g. NFPA 651 (aluminium), NFPA 652 (magnesium), NFPA 655 (sulphur).) Collectors designed to reduce airborne dust account for more than 40 percent of all dust explosions. Other important processes are grinding and pulverizing, transporting powders, filing silos and containers (which produces powder), and the mixing and blending of powders.

Investigation of 200 dust explosions and fires, between 1980 and 2005, indicated approximately 100 fatalities and 600 injuries. In January 2003, a polyethylene powder explosion and fire at the West Pharmaceutical Services plant in Kinston, North Carolina resulted in the deaths of six workers and injuries to 38 others. In February 2008, an explosion of sugar dust occurred at the Imperial Sugar Company's plant at Port Wentworth, Georgia, resulting in thirteen deaths.

== Characteristics ==
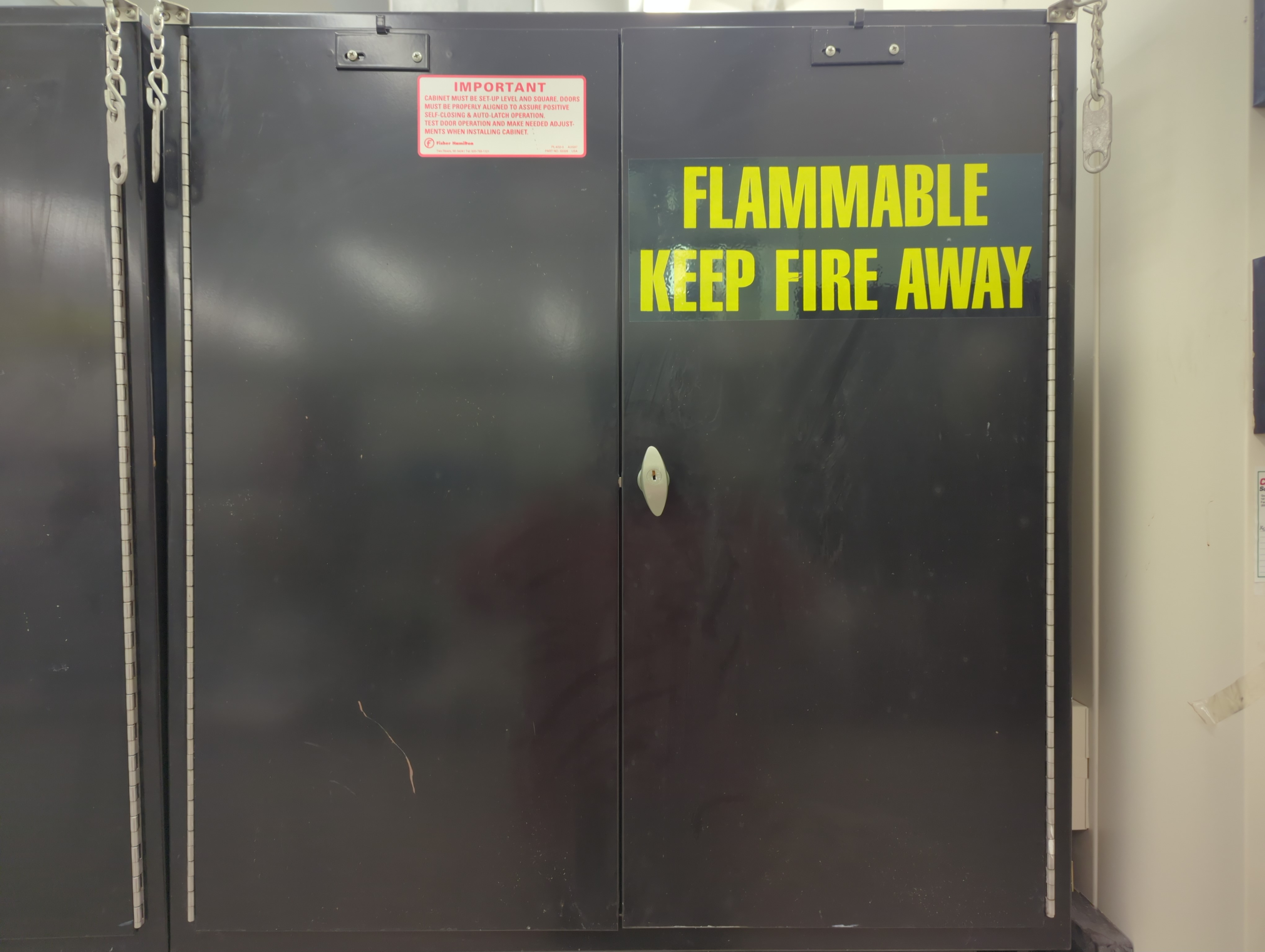
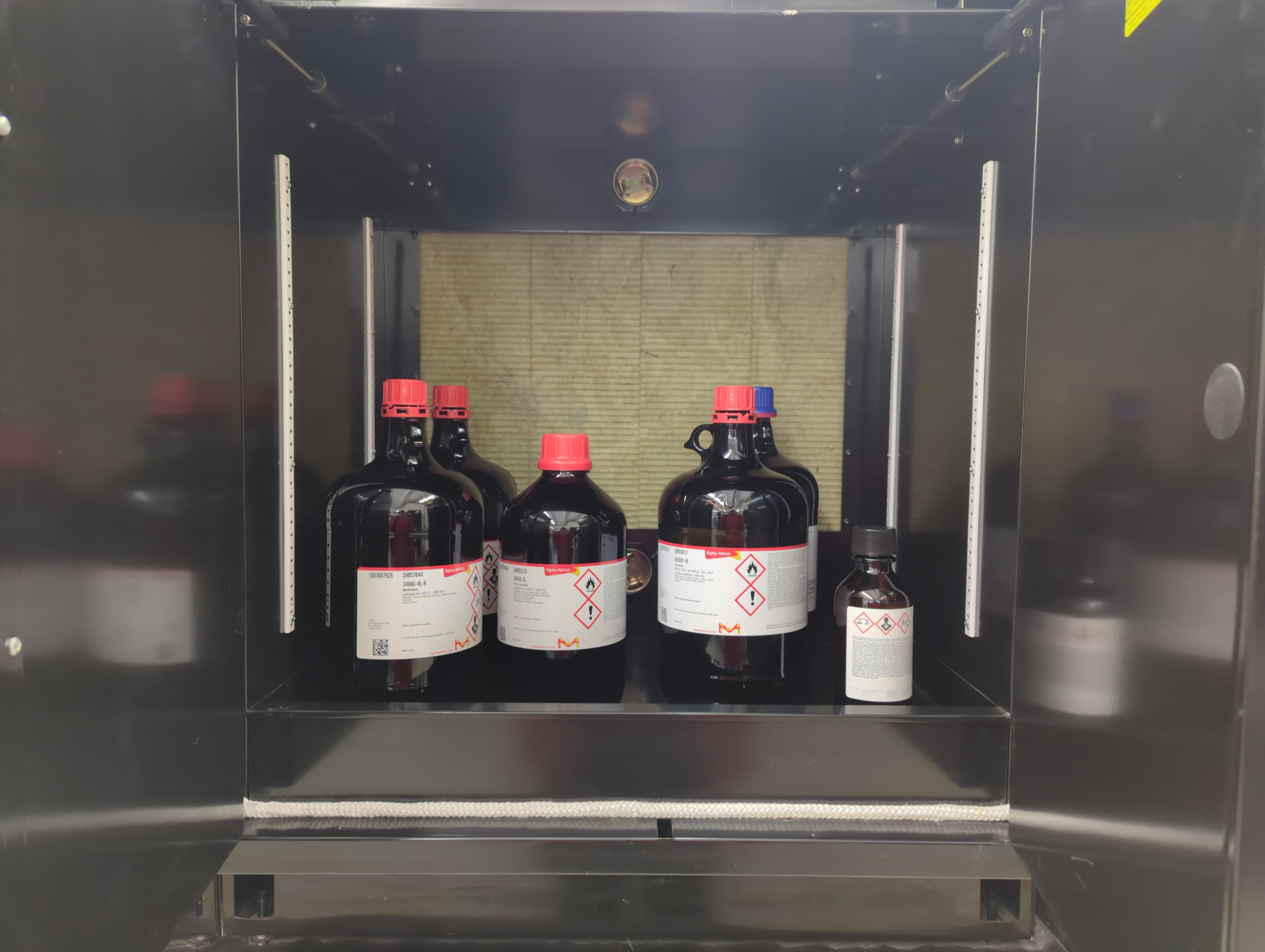
A flammable material storage cabinet, shown closed and open. The design of the cabinet prevents a fire inside the cabinet from escaping outside.

=== Flash point ===
A material's flash point is a metric of how easy it is to ignite the vapor of the material as it evaporates into the atmosphere. It is defined as the lowest material temperature required for fuel oils in the materials to begin to give off flammable vapors in a quantity high enough to support a flash of fire when ignited by an external source. A lower flash point indicates higher flammability. Materials with flash points below 100 °F (38 °C) are regulated in the United States by OSHA as potential workplace hazards.

=== Flame point ===
The flame point of a material is a temperature value at which sustained flame can be supported on the material once ignited by an external source. Once the flame point of a material is reached, it produces enough fuel vapors or oils to support continuous burning.

=== Flammability or explosive range ===
The lower flammability limit or lower explosive limit (LFL/LEL) represents the lowest air to fuel vapor concentration required for combustion to take place when ignited by an external source, for any chemical. Any concentration lower than this could not produce a flame or result in combustion. The upper flammability limit or upper explosive limit (UFL/UEL) represents the highest air to fuel vapor concentration at which combustion can take place when ignited by an external source. Any fuel-air mixture higher than this would be too concentrated to result in combustion. The values existing between these two limits represent the flammable or explosive range. Within this threshold, given an external ignition source, combustion of the particular fuel would likely happen.

=== Vapor pressure ===
The vapor pressure of a liquid is a measure of how much the vapor of the liquid tends to concentrate in the surrounding atmosphere as the liquid evaporates. Vapor pressure is a major determinant of the flash point and flame point, with higher vapor pressures leading to lower flash points and higher flammability ratings.

== Codes ==
The International Code Council (ICC) developed fire code requirements to provide adequate protection to a building and its occupants. These codes specify the combustibility rating for materials, the entrance and exit requirements, active fire protection requirements, and numerous other things. In the U.S., other agencies have also developed building codes that specify combustibility ratings. Following the requirements of these fire codes is crucial for higher occupancy buildings.

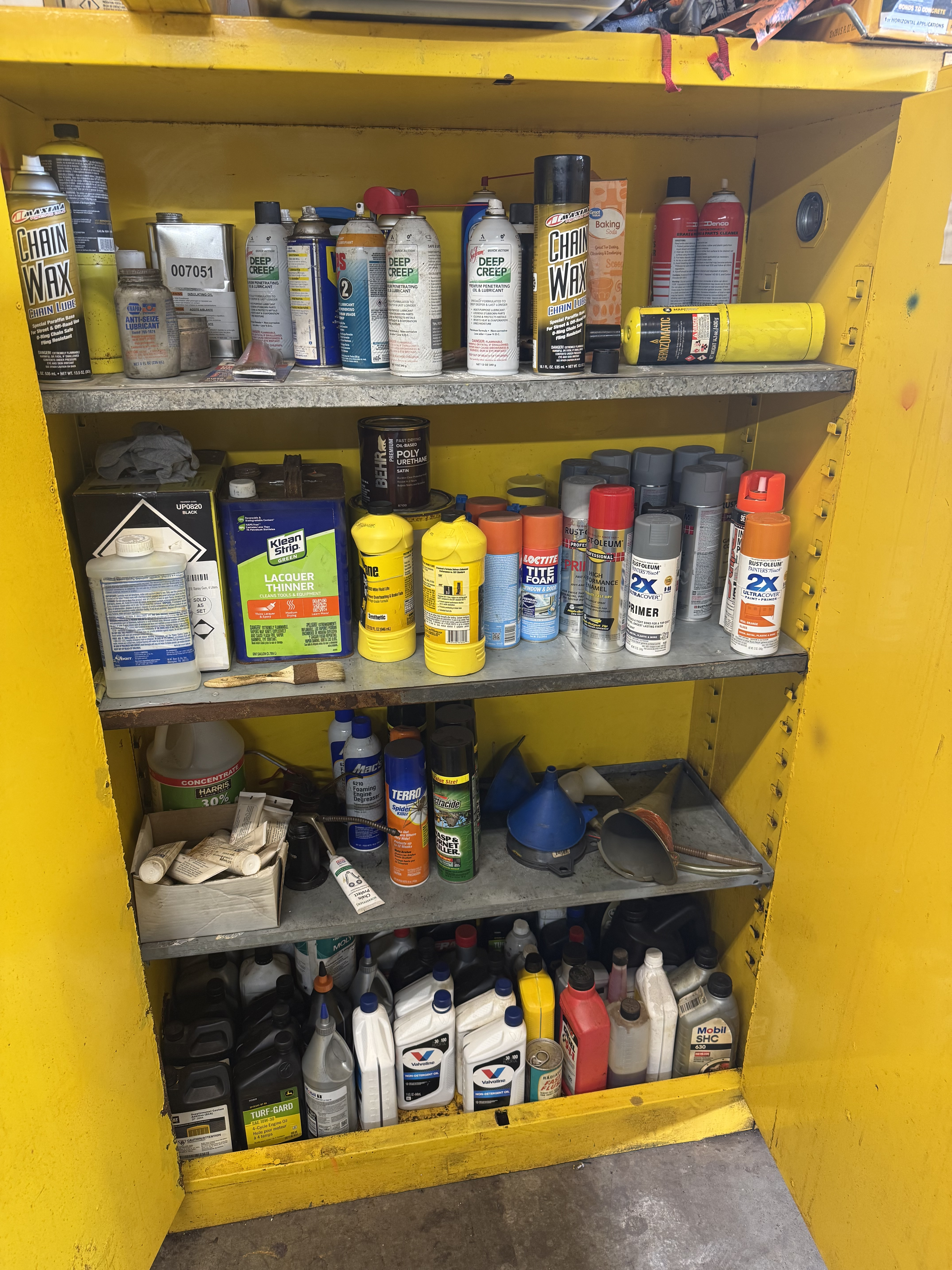
Flammable liquid cabinet often required by fire code.

For existing buildings, fire codes focus on maintaining the occupancies as originally intended. In other words, if a portion of a building were designed as an apartment, one could not suddenly load it with flammable liquids and turn it into a gas storage facility. The fire load and smoke development in that one apartment would be so immense it would overtax the active and passive fire protection means for the building. The handling and use of flammable substances inside a building is subject to the local fire code, which is enforced by the local fire prevention officer.

== Fire service relevance ==
Understanding combustibility and flammability is important for fire service operations. Flammable materials, like gasoline, produce vapors that can ignite at low temperatures. This can contribute to rapid fire spread, even to remote locations. Combustible materials, like wood, require a higher temperature to ignite, but will burn longer once it reaches that temperature.

Knowing what materials are present in a building is very important for firefighters. Knowing whether a material is flammable or combustible can help firefighters know what to expect as far as fire behavior and how quickly the fire may spread. Buildings with flammable liquids or gases would be at a higher risk for a quick growing fire with a lot of heat early on. Buildings storing combustibles may have a lower rate of spread, but can sustain burning longer.

There are many different factors that influence how materials will burn. Moisture, surface area, and the ventilation in the area are a few factors, as well as, flash points and ignition temperatures. Armed with knowledge like the flash point and whether it is considered flammable or combustible helps firefighters predict fire behavior and use the correct suppression methods. This increases scene safety overall.

=== Fire testing ===
Various countries have tests for determining non-combustibility of materials. Most involve the heating of a specified quantity of the test specimen for a set duration. Usually, the material must not support combustion and must not lose more than a specified amount of mass. As a general rule of thumb, concrete, steel, and ceramics - in other words inorganic substances - pass these tests. Building codes list them as suitable and sometimes mandate their use in certain applications. In Canada, for instance, firewalls must be made of concrete.

== Categorization of building materials ==
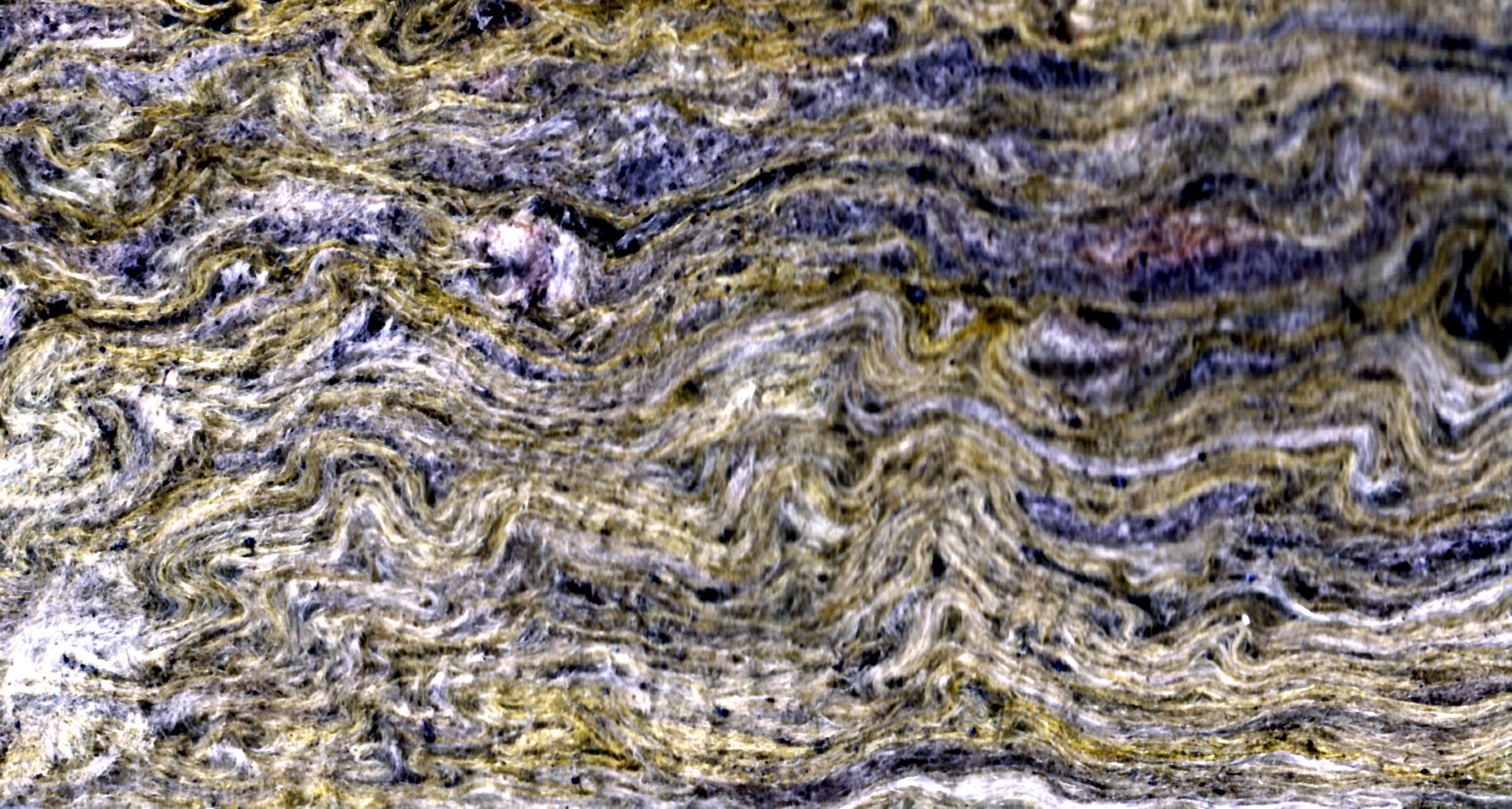
DIN4102 A1 noncombustible rockwool

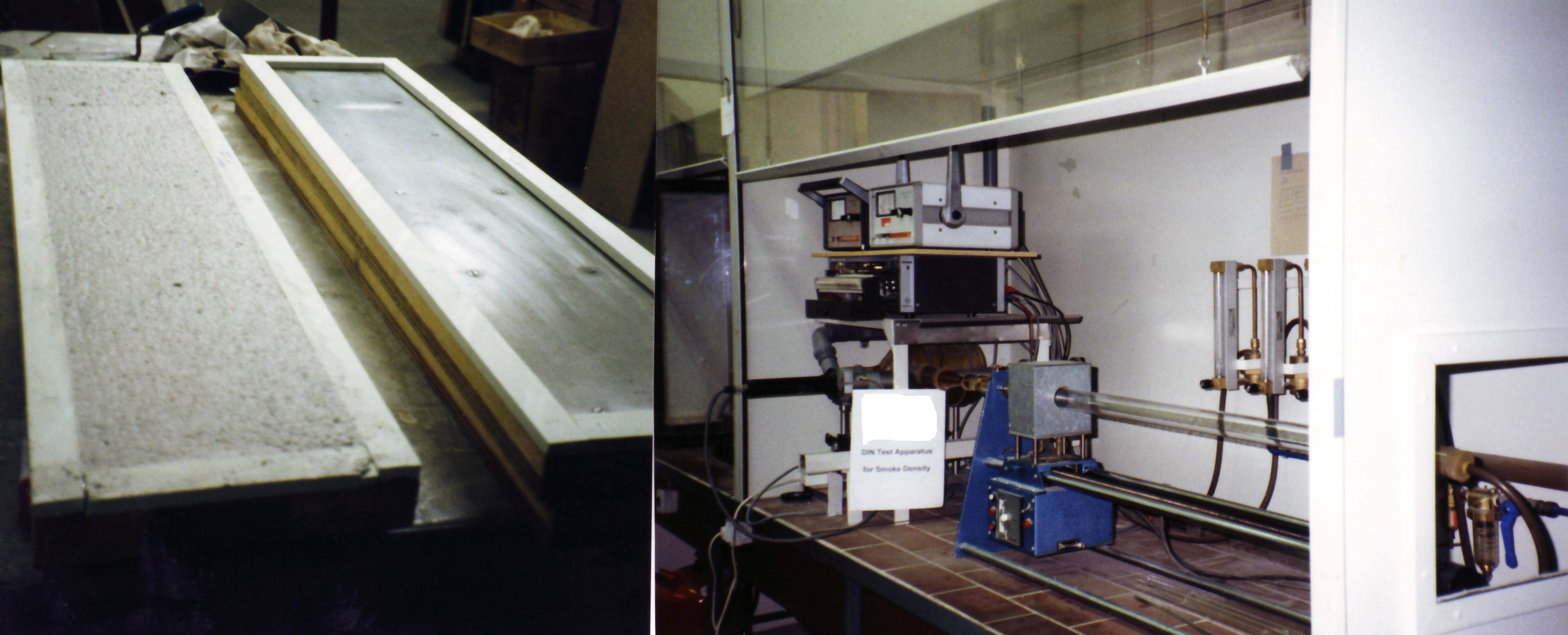
DIN4102 A2 gypsum fireproofing plaster leavened with polystyrene beads

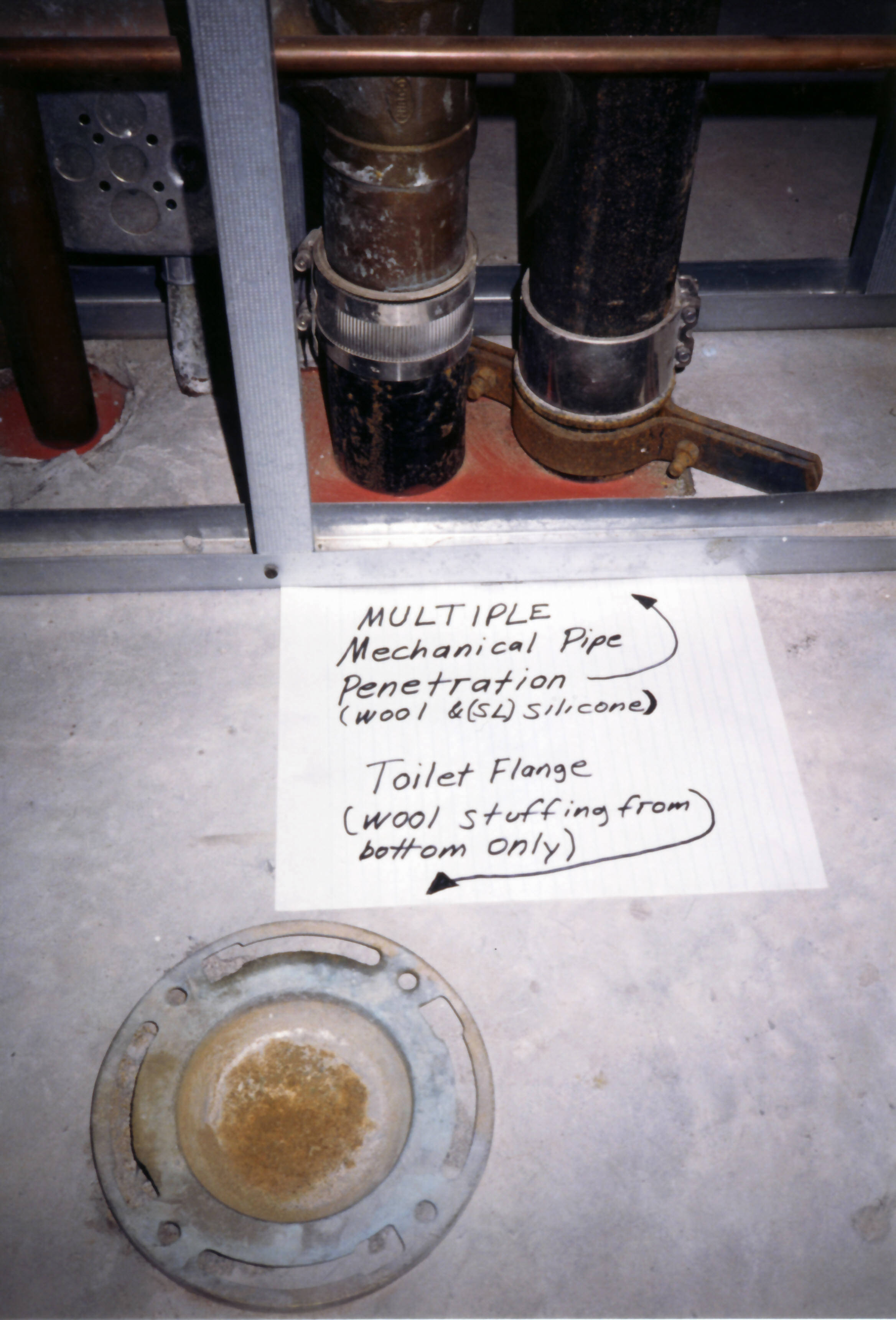
DIN 4102 B1 (difficult to ignite/often self-extinguishing) Silicone caulking used as a component in firestopping piping penetration

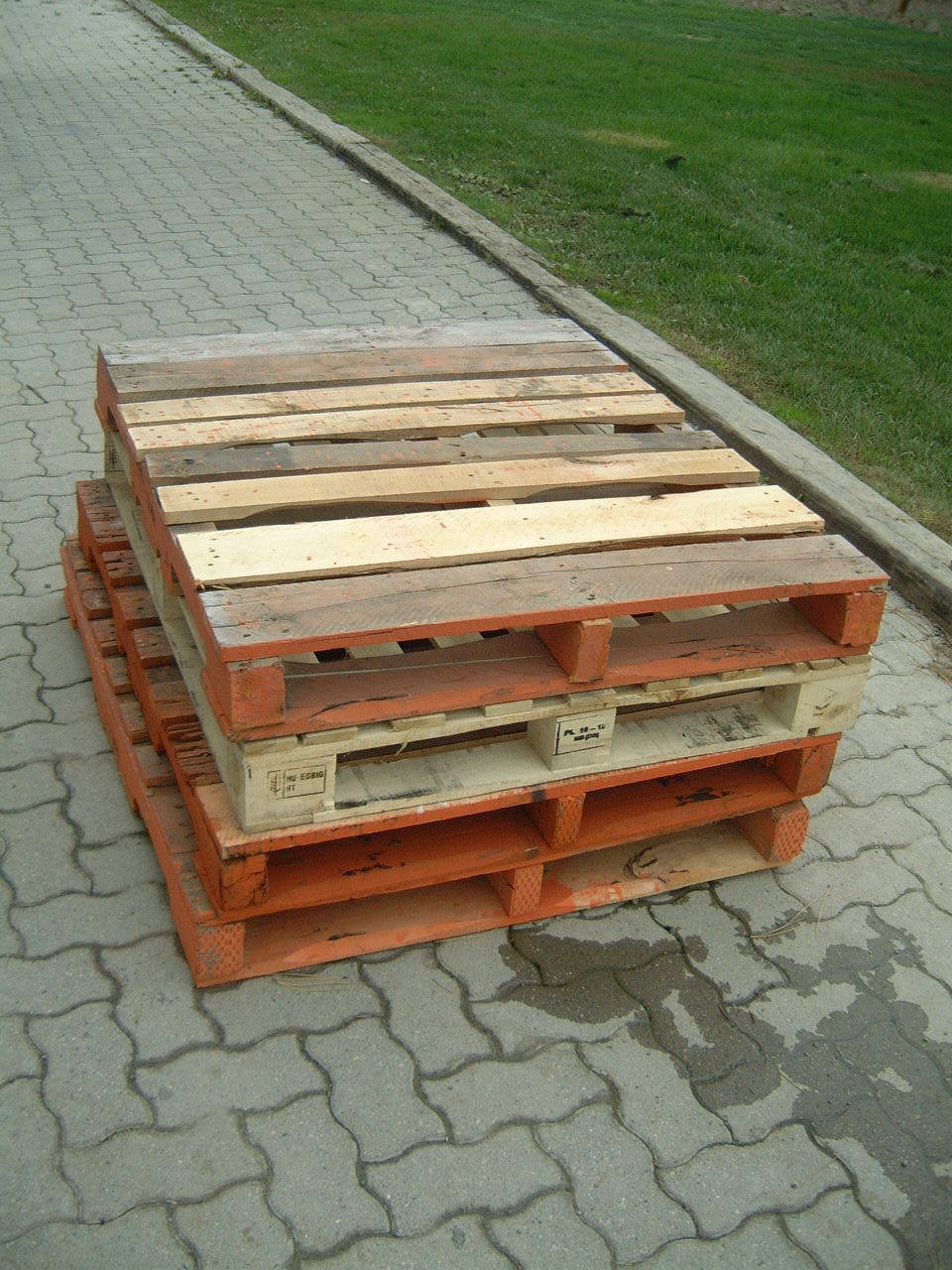
DIN 4102 B2: Timber, normal combustibility

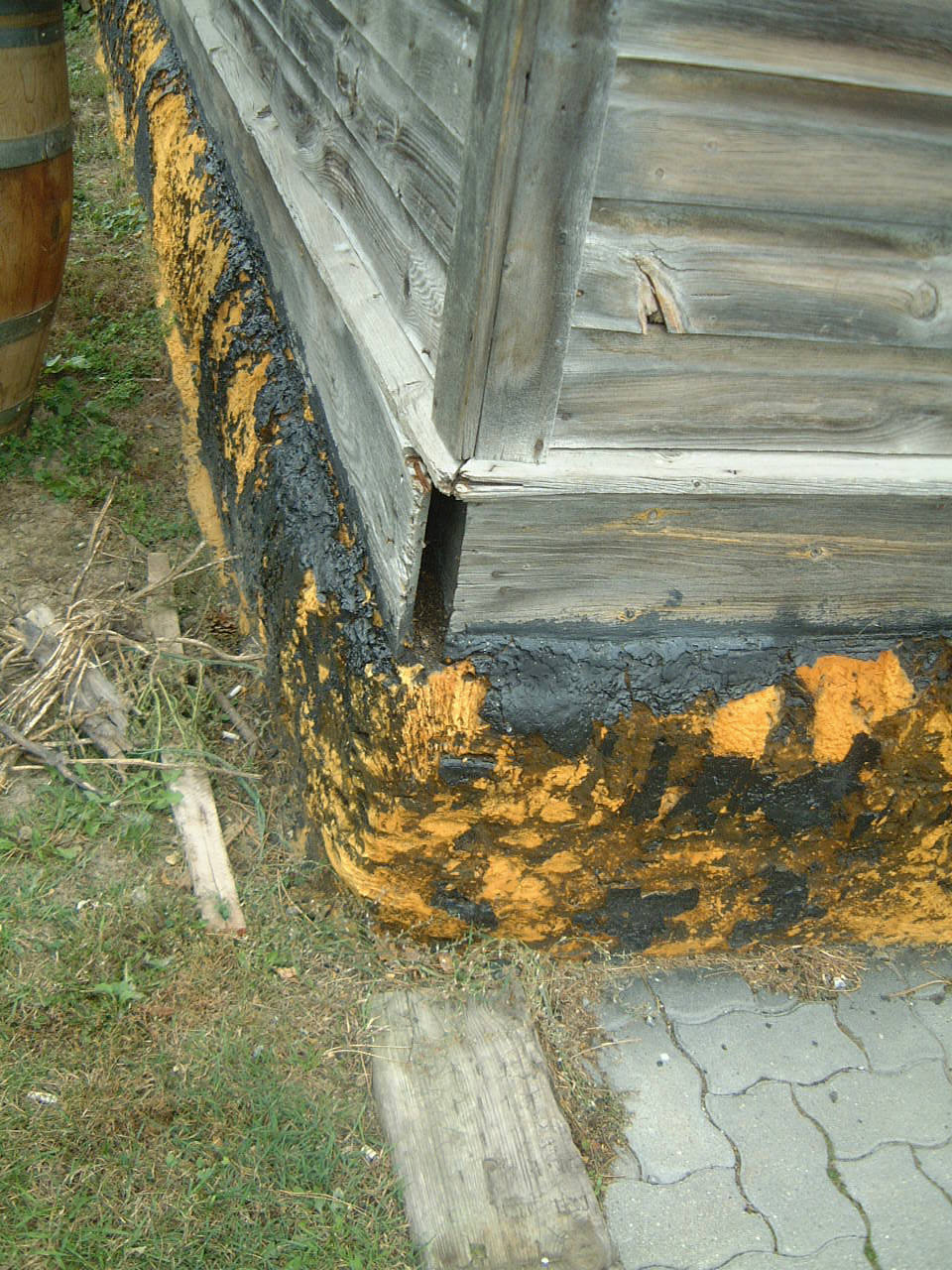
DIN 4102 B3: Polyurethane foam (easy to ignite = many hydrocarbon bonds usually)

Materials can be tested for the degree of flammability and combustibility in accordance with the German DIN 4102. DIN 4102, as well as its British cousin BS 476 include for testing of passive fire protection systems, as well as some of its constituent materials.

The following are the categories in order of degree of combustibility and flammability:

Rating	Degree of flammability	Examples
A1	100% noncombustible (nicht brennbar)	
A2	≈98% noncombustible (nicht brennbar)	
B1	Difficult to ignite (schwer entflammbar)	intumescents and some high end silicones
B2	Normal combustibility	wood
B3	Easily ignited (leicht entflammbar)	polystyrene

A more recent industrial standard is the European EN 13501-1 - Fire classification of construction products and building elements—which roughly replaces A2 with A2/B, B1 with C, B2 with D/E and B3 with F.

B3 or F rated materials may not be used in building unless combined with another material that reduces the flammability of those materials.

== See also ==
- Explosive material, reactive substance that contains a great amount of potential energy that can produce an explosion
- Fire test, means of determining whether fire protection products meet minimum performance criteria
- Fire protection, any measure to prevent or limit damage from fire
- Flammability limit, burning within well-defined lower and upper bounds
- Ultrafine particle, particulate matter under 100 nm in diameter
