= California Technical Bulletin 117 =

California fire safety law implemented in 1975

California Technical Bulletin 117 (TB 117) is a California fire safety law, first implemented in 1975. It has recently been updated as a Technical Bulletin 117-2013. The law requires fabric to pass a smouldering test. The test exposes fabrics and foams to burning cigarettes for 45 minutes. The ignition and char level are measured, with the goal being that the cigarette extinguishes without the fabric or foam igniting.
