= David Heimbach =

American surgeon and fraudster

David M. Heimbach (September 29, 1938 – August 7, 2017) was an American surgeon and a professor emeritus of the University of Washington. He gained notoriety as the "star witness" for the flame retardant industry. In 2014 he surrendered his medical license after it became apparent that he fabricated testimony and presented himself as an unbiased scientist when, in fact, he was paid by the industry.

== Professional career ==
Heimbach was born in Doylestown, Pennsylvania and graduated from Cornell University Medical College in 1964. From 1966 to 1968 he served as a captain in the United States Army Medical Command. He spent his surgical residency at the Parkland Memorial Hospital in Dallas and underwent further training to advance his medical interests. In 1977 he became the Director of the University of Washington Burn Center at Harborview Medical Center in Seattle, Washington. He became an early advocate of early burn wound excision, a technique that was later widely adopted. As a noted burn surgeon he published his research (among it clinical studies on the use of the skin substitute Integra), trained many surgeons, helped to develop burn centers, and gained widespread admiration and prestige. Among his recognitions were the presidency of the American Burn Association (1988) and of the International Society of Burn Injuries. In 2002 he stepped down as the Director of the burn unit at Harborview Medical Center, and in 2011 he retired as professor of the University of Washington.

== Witness for the flame retardant industry ==
In 2012 the Chicago Tribune published a series "Playing with Fire" that examined the issue of flame retardants in daily life. The series identified Heimbach as a paid advocate for the industry in a "campaign of deception … to promote the use of flame retardants."

Heimbach indicated that in 2009 he became aware of the now defunct Citizens for Fire Safety organization. This group was identified as a front group by three major flame retardant manufacturers, Albemarle Corporation, Israel Chemicals, and Chemtura Corporation. As the medical spokesman Heimbach testified in legislative hearings in different states promoting the agenda of the chemical industry. In the course of his presentation he showed falsified case reports that with their emotional impact influenced lawmakers. After the report of the Chicago Tribune, Heimbach defended his testimony by saying that he "wasn’t under oath". In 2012 the government of the State of Washington was discussing a bill to ban certain agents such as chlorinated tris (an agent banned from children's pajamas more than 30 years ago because of its toxicity) from children's products. Heimbach successfully urged the legislative to kill the ban. Heimbach presented himself as an unbiased medical expert although he received payments from industry. After the Medical Quality Assurance Commission started to investigate his actions he surrendered his license voluntarily.

=== Discovery and aftermath ===
Three reporters of the Chicago Tribune – Patricia Callahan, Sam Roe, and Michael Hawthorne – worked for more than a year to uncover the scientific distortions the flame retardant industry used to advance their agenda. Roe discovered during his studies that the gripping story of a burned baby that Heimbach presented to lawmakers was fiction. The series led to a number of results as delineated in the letter "To the jury" when their work was proposed for consideration of the Pulitzer Prize: A reform of California's standards of flammability, activity by the U.S. Senate, increased transparency, and changes in the industry. The three reporters were named finalists for the 2013 Pulitzer Prize in Investigative Reporting.

== Death ==
Heimbach died on August 7, 2017, at his home on Maui, Hawaii. He was 78 years old and survived by his wife, his sister, his two children and his four grandchildren.
