= You Might Be a Zombie and Other Bad News =

2010 book by Cracked.com

You Might Be a Zombie and Other Bad News: Shocking but Utterly True Facts
- Author: Cracked.com
- Language: English
- Genre: Humor, Trivia & Fun Facts
- Publisher: Plume (US)
- Publication date: 2010 (US)
- Publication place: United States
- Media type: Print (Hardcover & paperback & Audio)
- Pages: 320 p. (US hardcover edition)
- ISBN: 0452296390

You Might Be a Zombie and Other Bad News: Shocking but Utterly True Facts is a New York Times bestselling book from the staff of Cracked.com, which is the most visited humor website in the world. Published in 2010 by Plume, the book is a crowdsourced effort led by Cracked.com's editorial staff and more than 2,500 contributors from all over the world.

== Background ==
Cracked.com was founded in 2006 and currently receives over 300 million monthly page views. Cracked.com publishes at least one 2,000 – 3,000 word article every day of the week, most of which are read by over a million people. Their longtime editorial staff includes original editor-in-chief Jack O'Brien, David Wong who was added as an associate editor later in 2006, and Oren Katzeff who became Cracked.com's General Manager in November 2007 after running business development for Yahoo Media Group.

The title was inspired by one of Cracked.com's most popular articles called "5 Scientific Reasons a Zombie Apocalypse Could Actually Happen". Michael Swaim, a Cracked writer, notes that "Cracked.com has really been built on tricking you into learning stuff and [the book] is just a very natural extension of that."

== Synopsis ==
The comedy trivia book is composed of 38 articles, including 20 of the site's most popular articles. The additional 18 articles are exclusive to the book. The topics include the Zombie apocalypse, disgusting facts about bugs allowed in your food by the Food and Drug Administration, the secret menace that is dolphins, and other such facts. The book is written in Cracked.com's popular "listicle" format.

== Reviews and reception ==
You Might Be a Zombie was profiled by The Huffington Post and Forbes, with an endorsement from Spider-Man and X-Men creator Stan Lee. The book was described as "Smart, funny, and cool" by critic Roger Ebert and comedian Sarah Silverman noted that there was "finally a book that will tell you the truth about the things you need to know."

The book reached #9 on The New York Times Best Seller list, #13 on The Los Angeles Times Best Seller list, and sold more than 40,000 copies. As part of the marketing campaign, Cracked.com encouraged fans to post pictures of themselves alongside the book with 50-word captions.

== Contributors ==
You Might Be a Zombie has over 2,500 contributors, including:

- Nathan Birch
- Robert Brockway
- Adam Tod Brown
- Tim Cameron
- Erica Cantin
- Rory Colthurst
- Travis Corkery
- S Peter Davis
- Jacopo della Quercia
- Ben Dennison
- Justin Drops
- Robert Evans
- Tomas Fitzgerald
- Ian Fortey
- Alexandra Gedrose
- Gladstone
- Christina Hsu
- Peter Hildebrand
- David King
- Ben Joseph
- Richard Kane
- Jeff Kelly
- Stuart Layt
- Alex Levinton
- Daniel O'Brien
- Jack O'Brien
- Colm Prunty
- Tom Reimann
- Ned Resnikoff
- Levi Ritchie
- Seanbaby
- Michael Swaim
- Brian Thompson
- Brian Walton
- David Wong
- Winston Rowntree (illustrator)
- Anthony Clark (illustrator)
- Jordan Monsell (illustrator)
- Ben Driscoll (illustrator)
- Manuel Rebollo (illustrator)
- Shannon O'Brien (illustrator)
- Christopher Hastings (illustrator)
- Matt Barrs (illustrator)
- Brendan McGinley (illustrator)
- Brian Patrick (illustrator)
- Michael Swaim (illustrator)
- Randall Maynard (illustrator)
