= ScribbleLive =

Software company in Canada

ScribbleLive was a content cloud provider used by brands, sports, and media companies. It was based in Toronto.

== History ==
ScribbleLive was a privately owned company founded by Michael De Monte and Jonathan Keebler in 2008 to provide a live blogging software platform. The company evolved into a content marketing software company with data science capabilities. De Monte and Keebler were both employees at CTV when they started working on what would eventually become ScribbleLive, investing $1,500 into the initial project.

In 2009, De Monte and Keebler received seed funding from Rogers Ventures.

In 2009, Michael De Monte and Jonathan Keebler appeared on Dragon's Den. They received $250,000 Canadian from three Dragon's while giving up 30% of their company to them.

On November 10, 2011, ScribbleLive announced that it had raised $4 million in new financing, led by Summerhill Venture Partners.

ScribbleLive announced a second round of funding on June 19, 2013. This round of funding was led by Georgian Partners and included Export Development Canada (EDC), Summerhill Venture Partners, and Rogers Venture Partners. In January 2014, Vince Mifsud was appointed the new CEO of ScribbleLive.

On June 14, 2014, Scribble Technologies Inc. acquired CoveritLive from Demand Media for $4.5 (USD) million of cash and promissory note with a principal amount of $5.6 million.

On April 15, 2015, Scribble Technologies Inc. acquired Appinions Inc.

On January 30, 2016, ScribbleLive formally acquired Visually, the leading platform for premium content creation.

On August 23, ScribbleLive announced that it has acquired SEO company Linkdex. Linkdex was then sold to SEO software company Authoritas in June 2018.

In December 2019, Scribblelive was acquired by Rock Content, a Brazilian content marketing company headquartered in Belo Horizonte with offices in Boca Raton, Canada, and Mexico.

== Features ==
The browser-based application allowed users to post and edit content, insert images and video, create polls, provide comments, moderate and curate the social web. Content could be published via the web, SMS text messaging, and voicemail. The application also has features for Q&A sessions and live chats. Each event was archived and real-time analytics generated statistics on the event's coverage.

The platform allowed for collaboration between different parts of an organization, by allowing writers and editors to publish and edit content simultaneously. The platform also integrated with Twitter and Facebook.

On June 1, 2015, ScribbleLive released Projects, allowing content marketers and publishers to create content plans collaboratively. Other project features included content calendars, content promotion scheduling, and content analytics.

On March 17, 2016, ScribbleLive launched Plan. The service included workflow feature that assisted in coordinat messaging and content across various platforms.

On May 3, 2016, ScribbleLive announced updates to its Engage product. The update included a redesigned main interface, enhancements to the product's core curation tool, and the introduction of a new Moderation Hub.

== Event coverage ==
During the Egyptian Revolution, Al Jazeera was faced with multiple attempts to disrupt its coverage from Egypt due to internet restrictions. Reporters resorted to calling in live updates to their Al Jazeera's liveblog.

During the 2011 Tohoku earthquake and tsunami, Reuters.com used ScribbleLive to send live updates to their users, including news, videos, and photos from their journalists.
