= Hunker.com =

American website

- Website type: Home design, DIY, home improvement, gardening
- Available in: English
- Owner: Static Media (2024–present)
- Industry: Digital media
- Website: hunker.com
- Commercial: Yes
- Registration: None
- Launched: April 2017; 9 years ago
- Current status: Active

Hunker.com is an American website that covers home design, do-it-yourself home improvement, gardening, and cleaning. It was launched in 2017 by Leaf Group and has been owned by Static Media since 2024.

== History ==
Hunker was launched in April 2017 by Santa Monica-based Leaf Group, formerly known as Demand Media. It was the fourth of a series of topic-specific websites that the company built around content categories that had performed well on its eHow and Livestrong.com sites, following the pet site Cuteness, the technology site Techwalla, and the personal finance site Sapling. Hunker was created from eHow's instructional home content with an independent editorial team. Eve Epstein, a former editor-in-chief of DailyCandy, served as Hunker's editor-in-chief. By 2018, Hunker became one of the largest digital resources for home decor.

In January 2019, Hunker began a content collaboration with The New York Times called "How We're Living." During the same month, it opened Hunker House, a three-level house on Abbot Kinney Boulevard in Venice, Los Angeles, which it used for content production and events. In September 2019, Hunker introduced Hunker Made, its first branded product line, a furniture collection designed by its creative team that began with two versions of a table called the Rui. By 2021, Hunker had 10 million monthly readers.

In 2021, Graham Holdings acquired Leaf Group for $323 million. In April 2022, Hunker opened a second, 4,500-square-foot Hunker House in Venice, with a ground-floor showroom selling products through QR codes and upper floors that sponsors used for month-long activations. In May 2023, Graham Holdings split Leaf Group into three businesses, placing Hunker, Well+Good, Livestrong.com, and OnlyInYourState in a new lifestyle publishing company, World of Good Brands, led by Lindsey Abramo.

In December 2023, Hunker laid off part of its staff. Later, in 2024, Hunker was acquired by Static Media.

== Content ==
Hunker publishes articles on home design, gardening, do-it-yourself home improvement, cleaning, and home appliances. At launch, it featured home tours, product recommendations, personal essays, and design tips for homeowners and apartment dwellers.
