= Tales from the Pit =

Tales from the Pit may refer to:

- Purgatory (Tales From the Pit), a 2014 live album by heavy metal band Five Finger Death Punch
- Tales from the Pit, a podcast created by Michael Swaim
- Tales from the Pit, a spoken-word show series by Jake Roberts
