= Notes from the Internet Apocalypse =

2014 novel by Wayne Gladstone

- First edition
- Author: Wayne Gladstone
- Cover artist: Rob Grom
- Language: English
- Genre: Comedy, dystopian
- Published: March 4, 2014
- Publisher: St. Martin's Press
- Publication place: United States
- Pages: 224 pp
- Followed by: Agents of the Internet Apocalypse

Notes from the Internet Apocalypse is the first in a trilogy of books written by Cracked.com writer Wayne Gladstone entitled The Internet Apocalypse Trilogy.

The second novel in the trilogy, Agents of the Internet Apocalypse, was released on July 21, 2015.

== Plot ==
The Internet suddenly stops working and society collapses from its loss. Internet addicts wander the streets talking to themselves, the economy crashes and the government authorizes the NET Recovery Act.

For a man named Gladstone, the Internet's vanishing comes particularly hard, following the death of his wife, when he hears rumors that someone in New York City is still online.
