= David Lyman =

David Lyman may refer to:

- David Lyman, creator of NutshellMail, a social network aggregation service
- David Belden Lyman (1803–1884), American missionary to Hawaii
