= Livestrong (disambiguation) =

Livestrong can refer to:

- The Livestrong Foundation, an organization established by Lance Armstrong that supports for people affected by cancer
- Livestrong Sporting Park, former name for Children's Mercy Park, a soccer stadium in Kansas City, Kansas
- livestrong.com, a health brand operated by the Leaf Group
