= Live text =

Live text may refer to:

- Liveblogging
- iOS 15 Live Text recognition
- Text composed of characters in the user interface of a computer.
