= Calculords =

2014 mobile puzzle video game

- Developer: Ninja Crime
- Publisher: Ninja Crime
- Platforms: iOS; Android
- Genre: Turn-based strategy

Calculords was a turn-based strategy video game developed and published by Ninja Crime. It was released for iOS on February 21, 2014, and for Android in August of the same year. The game received positive reviews from critics, citing its inventive and fun gameplay. Per the game's website it is currently unavailable on iOS and Android as of 2023. On May 21, 2024, the team announced via X tthat the game, including its expansion packs, was free to play on the web or as an Android APK file available for download from itch.io.

== Gameplay ==
Calculords is based on the framework of a turn-based strategy game in which the player controls one side of three lanes and the opponent controls the other. Both sides attempt to destroy the other's base by sending troops towards it. Each base has a certain number of hit points; once those drop to zero, the base is destroyed and that side loses the game.

The player draws cards from a virtual deck representing units. These units have numbers, while the player is given a set of numbers at the start of each turn. The player must perform mathematical equations to make their set of numbers equal the numbers on the cards, at which time they can deploy that particular card. The player receives bonuses if they are able to use the entire set of numbers in a single turn, which increase for each turn they can use all the numbers.

== Plot ==
The player plays as the "Star Nerd", a human soldier who travels across the galaxy attempting to conquer various planets that are ruled by warlords.

== Development ==
The game's creator, Seanbaby, was inspired to develop the game because he thought CCG video games were "sort of a mess" and wanted to improve on them. He added the math equations to the game because he believed there was "something satisfying in having equations to work out". He did not mind if the math problems reduced the game's commercial appeal, saying that while he hoped the game was successful, his primary motivation was to have fun developing the game, and that those who were mainly motivated by making a commercially appealing game were "probably an asshole".

== Reception ==
The game was positively received by critics, with an aggregate score of 83 on Metacritic.

Zack Kotzer of Kill Screen noted that while the game was "not edutainment", it still made him "feel like a math hero of the universe" and "more confident in [his] relationship with numbers".
