= Boy Genius Report =

Technology news website

Boy Genius Report (BGR)
- Website type: Technology news
- Available in: English
- Creator: Jonathan S. Geller
- Parent: Static Media
- Website: bgr.com
- Commercial: Yes
- Launched: October 20, 2006; 19 years ago
- Current status: Online

Boy Genius Report (also referred to as BGR) is a technology-influenced website and covers topics ranging from consumer gadgets to entertainment, gaming, and science. Founded in October 2006 by anonymous web personality Boy Genius (also referred to as BG), the site was previously based on offering the public a look at upcoming mobile phones and devices before anyone else.

In April 2010, BGR was acquired by Penske Media Corporation. In 2025, it was sold to Static Media.

== Reception ==
BGR has been mentioned in many major news sources such as the Wall Street Journal blog Digits, ABC News, Reuters, The Huffington Post, and CNBC. Examples of BGR's ability to be the first to report news about a gadget include the first pictures of the Android 2.0 mobile operating system in 2009 and the first reported picture of the Amazon Kindle 2 in 2008.

As of August 2017, BGR reaches over 11 million unique visitors a month.

== Boy Genius ==
While running BGR, Boy Genius kept his identity concealed. On 27 April 2010, Boy Genius revealed himself as Jonathan Geller, a 23-year-old Greenwich, Connecticut, high school dropout. Geller initially chose to remain anonymous due to the marketing opportunities afforded him and his site (despite his identity being widely known by many of the organizations whose information he was disclosing). When BGR joined Penske Media Corporation, Geller decided it was best for both him and his site that he reveal himself as the site's founder and editor-in-chief.

== See also ==
- CNET
- Engadget
- Gizmodo
- TechCrunch
- The Verge
