= Gina Bianchini =

American entrepreneur and investor

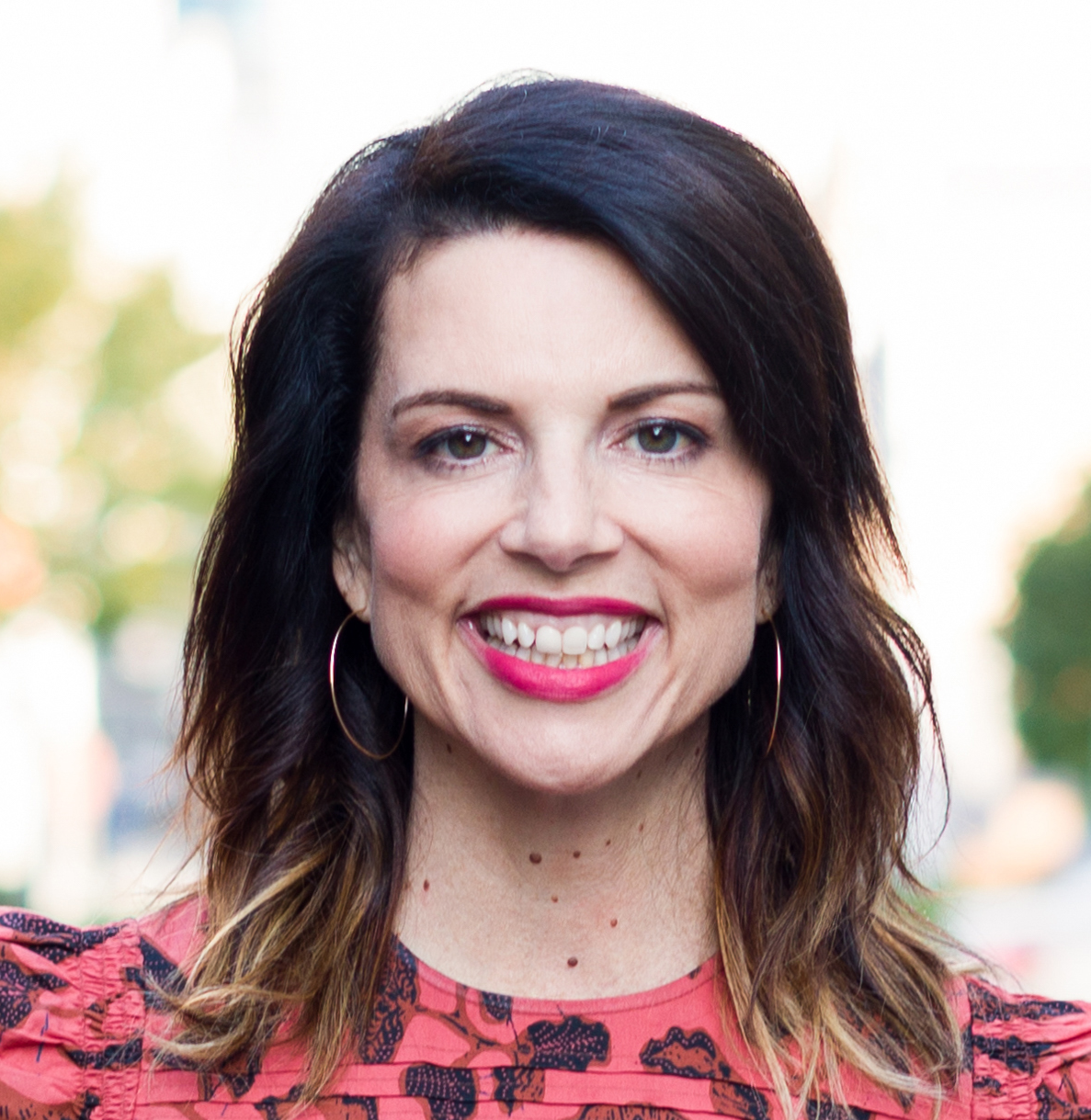
- Born: 1972 (age 53–54)
- Education: Stanford University (Bachelor of Arts, Political Science, 1994); Stanford Graduate School of Business (MBA, 2000)
- Occupations: CEO & Founder, Mighty Networks
- Years active: 2011–present
- Known for: Founder & CEO of Mighty Networks; Founder of Ning
- Spouse: John Alstrom

Gina Bianchini (born 1972) is an American entrepreneur and investor. She is the Founder & CEO of Mighty Networks.

== Early life and education ==
Bianchini grew up in Cupertino, California, and later earned her Bachelor of Arts degree in political science with honors from Stanford University in 1994. She began her career in the nascent High Technology Group at Goldman Sachs. In 2000, she completed her M.B.A. at the Stanford Graduate School of Business.

== Career ==
Bianchini co-founded Ning with Marc Andreessen, a platform that allowed users to create their own social networks. It became one of the major platforms during the Web 2.0 era and reached over 100 million users before being acquired. She served as CEO of Ning until 2010.

In 2011, she launched Mightybell, which later evolved into Mighty Networks—a SaaS platform that enables creators and entrepreneurs to build community-powered businesses, offer online courses, and manage memberships. The platform has been described as an alternative to Facebook Groups, with an emphasis on engagement and monetization for creators.

In April 2021, Mighty Networks raised $50 million in Series B funding led by Owl Ventures to expand its tools for creators and community builders.

Bianchini speaks on community-based entrepreneurship and has participated in conferences organized by SHRM, JPMorgan, and Stanford GSB.

Bianchini serves as a board director for TEGNA (NYSE: TGNA), a $3 billion broadcast and digital media company. She was also a board director of Scripps Networks (NASDAQ: SNI), owner of channels like HGTV, Food Network, and Travel Channel, until its acquisition by Discovery Communications in 2018. In 2022, she joined the board of directors of Holley Inc.

== Book ==
- Bianchini, Gina (21 November 2022). Purpose: Design a Community and Change Your Life---A Step-by-Step Guide to Finding Your Purpose and Making It Matter. Mighty Books. ISBN 979-8-9871914-0-8.
