= Liveblogging =

Type of blogging

A liveblog is blog posting intended to provide coverage of an ongoing event in rolling text, similar to live television or live radio. Liveblogging has increased in usage by news organizations and blogging establishments since the mid-2000s, when it was initially used to broadcast updates of technology conferences in the absence of or alongside streaming video captures, and like microblogging, has gained currency as an online publication format which performs the same function as live television news coverage.

The term "live text" is also used, for example by the BBC.

== Operation ==
Incorporative of microblogs (which are continuously updated but are also used widely as a short-form liveblogging platform), a liveblog is a single post which is constantly updated by one or more authors (usually on-location correspondents) with up-to-the-minute logs of the goings-on, and are usually performed during specific types of events rather than as regular features. Furthermore, during longer-running events beyond the length of twenty-four hours (such as civil, political or military events), a liveblog post will be ended after a 24-hour period and followed by a successive liveblog post for the next 24 hours.

=== Content and appearance ===
A live blog is a single post which is continuously updated with timestamped micro-updates which are placed above previous micro-updates.

During liveblogs, a wide number of media, including video, audio, images and text, can be incorporated in order to explain what is going on at a specific location. Such content may be posted from external sources, such as other press agencies and non-employees, if such content is only available from those sources (i.e., a live blog of an event by Al Jazeera English may post embedded video from CNN or YouTube if such video is centrally relevant to a recent occurrence within the scope of the event and is credited to authors affiliated with such organizations).

Live blogs are usually ordered from top-to-bottom so that the most recent updates appear at the top of the post. Posts may also be automatically updated using JavaScript-based auto-refreshes (by the minute) which do not reload the entire webpage.

== Relevance ==
=== Comparison with live broadcasting ===
Because of their synchronous nature, live blogs have been compared to live broadcasting on television and radio in their immediacy and currency. However, such blogs are almost always used for coverage of, and commentary on, one-time or specialized events, and live blogging is not yet widely considered a regular section-specific feature for most online news services, while news specialty channels tend to provide almost 24-hour live studio broadcasts in audio and/or video format without necessarily focusing dedicated coverage on specific current events except when necessary.

=== Usage ===
The format is most regularly used for blow-by-blow coverage of concurrently-occurring events, such as sports competitions. Other events which are increasingly regularly live-blogged are:

- Elections
- Ceremonies
- Conferences, conventions and gatherings
- Protests and conflicts
- Natural events and disasters
- Politically-restive countries

The format was originally devised by Gareth Owen for the BBC's coverage of the 2001 UK parliament budget and Owen and the BBC continued to pioneer the format for many years after. The format was later applied by websites such as Gizmodo, Engadget, TechCrunch and Macworld in 2003-2005 for coverage of technology-related events (such as the Macworld Expo's series of Stevenote's and the WWDC) first gained notoriety among news organizations during the coverage of the 2009 anti-government protests in Iran.

Further enhancement of the medium by the BBC and other media organizations accompanied later events such as Cablegate and the Arab Spring. The Guardian had been publishing "minute-by-minute" reports of local (and later locally-involved global) sports events since April 2001, but didn't first begun to publish official "minute-by-minutes" in the Politics blog until June 2007 (posts titled as "LIVE" or formatted to give time-stamped updates on events extend to as far as 2003), followed by more Guardian blogs adopting minute-by-minute formats for special events afterward.

News organizations have become increasingly adoptive of such platforms as Livefyre, CoverItLive, and ScribbleLive which allow for a dedicated box in which to publish short-form and mid-form updates with automatic, dynamically-generated appearances of the most recent posts.

A recent peer-reviewed publication outlines the utilization and perception of live blogging coverage at a physical therapy conference. The authors concluded that live blogging extended the viewing audience and facilitated viewer engagement. Survey respondents found the coverage educational, of high quality, and would participate again in the future.

=== Impact on journalism ===
The live blogging format is controversial for readers of news websites in that the presentation is a clear departure from more traditional methods of news gathering and presentation, both on- and offline. Matt Wells, blogs editor for The Guardian, contended that live blogs, rather than being the "death of journalism", will actually be the "embodiment of its future".
