= NutshellMail =

Social network aggregation service

- Website type: Social Network Aggregation
- Available in: English
- Owner: NutshellMail Inc.
- Creators: David Lyman, Mark Schmulen, David Neubauer
- Website: nutshellmail.com
- Launched: October 2008
- Current status: defunct

NutshellMail was a social network aggregation service that allowed users to manage and interact with updates from social networking services through a consolidated email digest. NutshellMail supported Facebook, Twitter, MySpace, LinkedIn, and Ning.

In March 2008, PC World wrote an article suggesting that NutshellMail could allow users to streamline their social network experience LifeHacker called NutshellMail "The Sledgehammer" to filter and manage online social lives in a May 2009 article.

== Background ==
NutshellMail was founded in October 2008 by David Lyman, Mark Schmulen, Scott Mury, and David Neubauer. NutshellMail initially launched with a focus on email consolidation. However, as social networks and social media such as Facebook, MySpace and Twitter dramatically increased their user bases, NutshellMail released support for these services and made social network aggregation and interaction the primary focus of its development.

On May 24, 2010, NutshellMail was acquired by Constant Contact.

In September 2010, NutshellMail discontinued their email consolidation service altogether to focus on social media based features.

In February 2016, Constant Contact announced the service shutdown for March 22, 2016.

== Recognition ==
On May 28, 2009, Facebook announced that NutshellMail was one of 20 winners of the fbFund 2009 competition out of a pool of over 400 applicants. NutshellMail was participating in the fbFund 2009 Rev incubator program and had received funding through the fbFund. fbFund was administered by Facebook and funded by Accel Partners and The Founders Fund. On November 19, 2009, Ning announced that Nutshellmail won the Ning Appathon competition as a Best Ported App finalist.
