= Saatchi Art =

Online art gallery

Saatchi Art Group
- Company type: Subsidiary
- Founded: May 1, 2010; 16 years ago, in Santa Monica, California
- Headquarters: 1655 26th Street, Santa Monica, California, United States
- Key people: Sarah Meller (CEO; 2023–present)
- Website: www.saatchiart.com

Saatchi Art Group is a Los Angeles-based e-commerce platform and online art gallery. Saatchi Art is an art platform that aims to help new artists enter the global art market. It is composed of the Saatchi Art online marketplace, The Other Art Fair, and the group's Hospitality Art Advisory.

== History ==
Saatchi Art was founded in 2010 as Saatchi Online, which was owned by Charles Saatchi.

It was acquired by Demand Media, Inc. (currently Leaf Group) in August 2014, which was then bought by Graham Holdings Company in 2021.

In 2016, Saatchi Art acquired The Other Art Fair. Based in London and founded by Ryan Stanier, the Other Art Fair now operates across 3 continents and is the largest artist-led art event in the world.

In 2018, Saatchi Art debuted its hospitality art advisory services, offering art programming for hotels, restaurants, residential buildings, and healthcare institutions. The senior hospitality art advisory team has curated artworks for Four Seasons, Nobu Hotels, 1 Hotels, Waldorf Astoria, The Ritz-Carlton, St. Regis, and other brands.

In 2023, Sarah Meller was appointed CEO of Saatchi Art. Rebecca Wilson currently serves as Saatchi Art’s chief curator and vice president. She was formerly a director at the Saatchi Gallery in London and was responsible for maintaining the gallery's online presence.

== Controversies ==
In November 2014, Charles Saatchi, then owner of Saatchi Gallery, initiated multiple legal actions in the United Kingdom's Chancery Division of High Court of Justice against Leaf Group, the current owners of Saatchi Art. Charles Saatchi's contention arose from an alleged breach of an intellectual property agreement dated February 18, 2010, prompting him to ask Demand Media to cease the usage of the “Saatchi Art” name and compensate him for profits made from the name since the alleged breach. He also alleged that the low average transaction price on Saatchi Art might dilute the Saatchi brand's association with the high-end art market.
