= Cracked After Hours =

2010s American web series

- Created by: Jack O'Brien; Daniel O'Brien
- Directed by: Justin Viar; Abe Epperson; Adam Ganser; Moana Sherrill
- Starring: Michael Swaim; Katie Willert; Soren Bowie; Daniel O'Brien; Yazmin Monet Watkins; Kimia Behpoornia; Carmen Angelica; Cody Johnston
- No. of seasons: 7
- No. of episodes: 86

Original release
- Release: July 19, 2010 – November 20, 2017

Cracked After Hours is a comedy web series created by Jack O'Brien and Daniel O'Brien and hosted on the website Cracked.com (and simultaneously on YouTube). Produced by Cracked and its then-parent company The E. W. Scripps Company, the series premiered on July 19, 2010, and its final episode was released on November 20, 2017.

== Overview ==
The scripted comedy followed four friends/co-workers of Cracked.com who meet after work at their local diner. The Seinfeldian conversations usually result in heavily disputed opinions about pop culture and life in general.

The series was launched on July 19, 2010 with an episode centered around the 1985 film Back to the Future, and grew to become the most viewed web series on Cracked.com. The show's first 13 episodes had reached 15 million views by April 2012 and it subsequently expanded to 30 episodes and surpassed 25 million total views. It starred Cracked.com employees Michael Swaim, Daniel O'Brien, and Soren Bowie and regular Cracked contributor Katie Willert. Most episodes were written by one of the stars or series co-creator Jack O'Brien, with help from the Cracked team.

The series integrated animated segments created by artists Winston Rowntree, Brett Herholz, Anthony Clark, and Matt Barrs. Characters' thoughts are illustrated by thought-bubbles or full-screen display. The first 22 episodes were directed by Justin Viar. Subsequent episodes were directed by Abe Epperson, Adam Ganser or various others.

The episode "Why Mario is Secretly a Dick With a Mustache" infamously had a slightly extended version when first uploaded to YouTube. This was quickly replaced by the regular version with a new title card because the original one used unauthorized artwork from internet artist "Fictionalhead."

In 2014, After Hours won a Webby Award.

=== Introduction of second cast (2017) ===
The July 24, 2017 episode "Awkward Scenes That Must Have Happened In Marvel Movies" introduced a second cast of diner patrons: Yazmin Monet Watkins, Kimia Behpoornia, Cracked writer Carmen Angelica and Cracked head writer for video Cody Johnston. This group meets at the same diner, and has similar pop culture conversations. Before its cancellation, episodes of this second cast were to be released monthly, alongside new episodes from the original cast.

=== Cancellation ===
Prior to December 4, 2017, Soren Bowie had left Cracked to pursue another writing job while Michael Swaim had quit in October to pursue other media. On December 4, 2017, Cracked laid off a significant number of staff members, including Daniel O'Brien, Carmen Angelica, and Cody Johnston. Before this, an episode had been filmed which would be the final one to feature the original cast, allowing the show to continue with the new cast. In the wake of the layoffs, this episode was never aired. The last episode uploaded to the Cracked YouTube channel was "The Best Movie Hell to End Up In" on November 20, 2017.

=== After After Hours ===
On April 9, 2019, via the Small Beans Patreon, Michael Swaim announced that he and several other of his Cracked alumni would be raising money to create a new version of After Hours away from Cracked.com. In the update, Swaim stated that the new show Off Hours would focus on four friends who 'discuss pop culture in their spare time, accompanied by fanciful illustrations and masterfully-edited clip packages'. He went on to say that everybody working on it had a prior association with After Hours and that episodes would be directed by Abe Epperson (the director of many After Hours episodes) with a revolving cast including Swaim, Cody Johnston, Katy Stoll, Greg Burke, Damien Washington, Maggie Mae Fish, Teresa Lee and Daniel Vincent Gordh.

On May 10, 2019, Michael Swaim tweeted a logo for the new show designed by Small Beans artist Michael Bramley and added; 'It's real now, you guys. There are art assets. This is really happening.'

On July 12, 2020, the original cast met for a charity stream, doing a table read for the intended series finale for the original cast. The episode saw the group discuss "What TV Friend Group would be the best to join" - as it's revealed that the foursome is about to go their own ways. The stream ended up raising $11,000 for the CDC Foundation.

On May 28, 2021, the original cast released another series finale on the Small Beans channel, titled "The After Hours Quarantine Special."

== Episodes ==
=== Season 1: 2010–2011 ===
#	Title	Writer	Director	Original airdate
1	"Why 'Back to the Future' Is Secretly Horrifying"	Daniel O'Brien	Justin Viar	July 19, 2010
2	"5 Classic Movie High Schools That Would Suck to Attend"	Jack O'Brien	Justin Viar	August 30, 2010
3	"Which Apocalypse Would Be the Most Fun?"	Daniel O'Brien	Justin Viar	November 18, 2010
4	"Why The Harry Potter Universe Is Secretly Terrifying"	Michael Swaim	Justin Viar	December 20, 2010
5	"How Breakfast Cereal Mascots Brainwashed You"	Soren Bowie	Justin Viar	January 31, 2011
6	"Which Ninja Turtle Are You?"	Soren Bowie	Justin Viar	March 14, 2011
7	"Why Star Wars Is Terrifying for Women"	Daniel O'Brien	Justin Viar	April 4, 2011
8	"Why Everyone Wants to Have Sex with Vampires"	Soren Bowie	Justin Viar	May 23, 2011
9	"Why Batman Is Secretly Terrible for Gotham"	Daniel O'Brien	Justin Viar	June 27, 2011
10	"The Best Super Power (Is Not What You Think)"	Michael Swaim	Justin Viar	July 25, 2011
11	"TV Ads That Depict Terrifying Alternate Universes"	Soren Bowie	Justin Viar	September 26, 2011
12	"4 Terrifying Psychology Lessons Behind Famous Movie Monsters"	Robert Brockway	Justin Viar	October 24, 2011

=== Season 2: 2012 ===
#	Title	Writer	Director	Original airdate
1	"Why Mario is Secretly a Douchebag"	Daniel O'Brien	Justin Viar	March 12, 2012
2	"If You Could Have Dinner (And Sex) With Any Famous Figure"	Jack O'Brien	Justin Viar	April 2, 2012
3	"Why The Scariest Sci-Fi Robot Uprising Has Already Begun"	Jack O'Brien	Justin Viar	April 16, 2012
4	"The 6 Most Unintentionally Creepy Sitcom Characters"	Cody Johnston	Justin Viar	April 30, 2012
5	"3 Popular Children's Characters Who Secretly Hate Animals"	Daniel O'Brien	Justin Viar	May 29, 2012
6	"Why The Star Trek Universe is Secretly Horrifying"	Michael Swaim	Justin Viar	May 14, 2012
7	"4 Creepy Hidden Truths Behind Popular Scary Stories"	Jack O'Brien	Abe Epperson	July 9, 2012
8	"Why Pixar Movies Are All Secretly About the Apocalypse"	Daniel O'Brien	Justin Viar	September 4, 2012
9	"Why Indiana Jones Secretly Sucks at His Job"	Michael Swaim	Abe Epperson	September 24, 2012
10	"The Only 8 Types of TV Shows That Get Made"	Daniel O'Brien	Abe Epperson	October 15, 2012
11	"5 Reasons James Bond Might Be the Worst Spy Ever"	Soren Bowie	Justin Viar	November 12, 2012
12	"The 4 Worst Lessons Disney Movies Taught Us as Kids"	Jack O'Brien	Justin Viar	December 17, 2012

=== Season 3: 2013 ===
#	Title	Writer	Director	Original airdate
1	"Four Reasons Spider-Man is Secretly Bad at His Job"	Michael Swaim	Justin Viar	January 21, 2013
2	"Why Romantic Comedies Are Secretly Bad for You"	Soren Bowie	Adam Ganser	February 14, 2013
3	"The 4 Best Movie Universes To Die In"	Cody Johnston	Adam Ganser	March 25, 2013
4	"5 Horrifying Secret Rules of Life in a Movie Universe"	Daniel O'Brien	Abe Epperson	April 15, 2013
5	"The Horrifying Truth About Life Inside of Movie Musicals"	Kristi Harrison	Adam Ganser	May 13, 2013
6	"The 3 Worst Lessons Taught by '80s Sports Movies"	Jack O'Brien	Adam Ganser	June 17, 2013
7	"Why Tarantino Films Take Place in the Same (Insane) Universe"	Soren Bowie	Adam Ganser	July 22, 2013
8	"4 Movie Apocalypses That Would Be More Fun Than Reality"	Daniel O'Brien	Adam Ganser	August 19, 2013
9	"4 Disney Movie Villains Who Were Right All Along"	Daniel O'Brien	Abe Epperson	September 23, 2013
10	"The Horrifying Secret 'The Matrix' Reveals About Humanity"	Jack O'Brien	Abe Epperson	October 21, 2013
11	"The 10 Most Secretly Ridiculous Moments in Classic Movies"	Daniel O'Brien	Adam Ganser	November 18, 2013
12	"6 Beloved Christmas Movies With Horrible Secret Meanings"	Michael Swaim	Adam Ganser	December 16, 2013

=== Season 4: 2014 ===
#	Title	Writer	Director	Original airdate
1	"4 Weirdly Specific Things Famous People Do in Every Movie"	Jack O'Brien	Abe Epperson	January 13, 2014
2	"8 Mind-Blowing Connections Between the Works of Joss Whedon"	Michael Swaim	Abe Epperson	February 17, 2014
3	"7 Horrifying Lessons Hidden in Famous Movies About Childhood"	Soren Bowie	Abe Epperson	March 10, 2014
4	"6 Insane Stereotypes That You Still See in Every Movie"	Daniel O'Brien	Adam Ganser	April 14, 2014
5	"5 'Jurassic Park' Plot Holes With Horrifying Implications"	Jack O'Brien	Adam Ganser	May 12, 2014
6	"11 Movie Alternate Dimensions With Horrifying Downsides"	Soren Bowie	Adam Ganser	June 16, 2012
7	"Why Disney's 'Aladdin' Is Secretly Horrifying"	Daniel O'Brien	Abe Epperson	July 14, 2014
8	"Why 'Peter Pan' Is Propaganda for Perverts"	Soren Bowie	Abe Epperson	August 18, 2014
9	"The Horrifying Hidden Subplot You Missed in Star Wars"	Cody Johnston	Abe Epperson	September 8, 2014
10	"6 Weirdly Conservative Messages Hidden in 'Ghostbusters'"	Soren Bowie	Adam Ganser	October 20, 2014
11	"5 Movie Epilogues That Should Have Been Sequels"	Soren Bowie	Adam Ganser	November 10, 2014
12	"The 9 Creepiest Things Movies Portray as Romantic"	Daniel O'Brien	Adam Ganser	December 8, 2014

=== Season 5: 2015 ===
#	Title	Writer	Director	Original airdate
1	"5 Racist and Sexist Messages Hidden in Forrest Gump"	Jack O'Brien	Abe Epperson	January 12, 2015
2	"14 Super Powers That Every Movie Character Apparently Has"	Michael Swaim	Abe Epperson	February 9, 2015
3	"5 Evil Organizations We Wouldn't Mind Joining (in Movies)"	Soren Bowie	Abe Epperson	March 2, 2015
4	"Why The Friends From 'Friends' Are Terrible People"	Katie Willert	Adam Ganser	April 13, 2015
5	"Movies Secretly Told From The Perspective Of One Character"	Katie Willert	Adam Ganser	May 11, 2015
6	"10 Terrifying Implications Of The Matrix Universe"	Michael Swaim	Adam Ganser	June 15, 2015
7	"Why Movie Cops Are Terrible At Their Jobs"	Soren Bowie	Abe Epperson	July 27, 2015
8	"The 3 Worst Lessons Hiding in Children's Movies"	Daniel O'Brien	Abe Epperson	August 17, 2015
9	"The Terrifying Truth About Doc Brown"	Jack O'Brien		October 21, 2015
10	"'Stupid' Movies That Are Surprisingly Progressive"	Katie Willert	Adam Ganser	November 16, 2015
11	"4 Reasons The Jedi Are Secretly The Bad Guys Of Star Wars"	Alex Schmidt	Abe Epperson	December 14, 2015

=== Season 6: 2016 ===
#	Title	Writer	Director	Original airdate
1	"Why Sauron Is Secretly The Good Guy In 'Lord Of The Rings'"	JF Sargent	Adam Ganser	January 11, 2016
2	"Why Body-Switching Movies Are Way Creepier Than You Think"	Teresa Lee	Abe Epperson	February 22, 2016
3	"4 Insane Simpsons Fan Theories (That Might Be True)"	Michael Swaim	Abe Epperson	March 7, 2016
4	"Why The Most Terrifying Movie Alien Isn't Who You Think"	David C. Bell	Abe Epperson	April 11, 2016
5	"Why Professor X Is Really The Villain Of The X-Men Universe"	Soren Bowie	Adam Ganser	May 23, 2016
6	"What Your Favorite Video Game Says About You"	JF Sargent	Adam Ganser	June 20, 2016
7	"The Horrifying Truth About Living Inside A TV Show "	Alex Schmidt	Adam Ganser	July 18, 2016
8	"The Only Film Genre That Gets You To Root For The Bad Guy"	Carmen Angelica	Abe Epperson	August 29, 2016
9	"Why Captain America Is The Worst Avenger"	Alex Schmidt	Abe Epperson	September 19, 2016
10	"7 Movies That Don't Realize They're Horror Movies"	David C. Bell	Abe Epperson	October 17, 2016
11	"Why Every '80s Sitcom Decided To Kill Off The Mom"	Soren Bowie	Adam Ganser	November 21, 2016
12	"Why Homer Simpson Might Be God"	Michael Swaim	Adam Ganser	December 19, 2016

=== Season 7: 2017 ===
#	Title	Writer	Director	Original airdate
1	"The Best And Worst Disney Kingdoms To Live In"	JF Sargent	Adam Ganser	January 23, 2017
2	"4 Movie Curses With Unexpected Upsides"	Cody Johnston	Abe Epperson	February 20, 2017
3	"How To Ruin Your Favorite Sitcoms With Simple Math"	Soren Bowie	Abe Epperson	March 20, 2017
4	"The Inevitable Future Of Each Superhero Universe"	Michael Swaim	Abe Epperson	April 17, 2017
5	"Why Movies Want Us To Torture Adults"	Carmen Angelica	Adam Ganser	May 15, 2017
6	"All Arnold Schwarzenegger Movies Are In The Same Terminator Universe"	Adam Ganser	Adam Ganser	June 5, 2017
7	"How 9/11 Changed 90s Sitcoms Forever (Friends, Seinfeld)"	Cody Johnston	Adam Ganser	June 19, 2017
8	"5 Movie Villains That Would Make Great Leaders (Game of Thrones, The Dark Knight)"	Carmen Angelica	Abe Epperson	July 10, 2017
9	"Awkward Scenes That Must Have Happened In Marvel Movies (Captain America, The Hulk)"	Daniel O'Brien	Abe Epperson	July 24, 2017
10	"Why Time Travel Wouldn't Work For Everyone"	Soren Bowie	Adam Ganser	August 14, 2017
11	"Why Disney Princes Are Bad Role Models For Boys"	Carmen Angelica	Adam Ganser	August 28, 2017
12	"6 Movies Whose Timelines Don't Add Up"	David C. Bell	Adam Ganser	September 11, 2017
13	"What Movie Ghost Would You Rather Be Haunted By"	David C. Bell	Adam Ganser	October 2, 2017
14	"Which Ghost Movie Was The Best (For The Ghosts)? (Casper, Ghostbusters, RIPD)"	Tom Reimann	Adam Ganser	October 23, 2017
15	"The Best Movie Hell to End Up In"	Carmen Angelica	Moana Sherrill	November 20, 2017
