= After the Revolution =

2022 speculative fiction novel by Robert Evans

- Cover illustration for the book
- Author: Robert Evans
- Illustrator: Tavia Morra
- Cover artist: Tavia Morra
- Language: English
- Genre: Speculative fiction, military fiction, science fiction
- Publisher: AK Press
- Publication date: 2022
- Publication place: United States
- Media type: Print (Paperback), E-book, Audiobook
- Pages: 380
- ISBN: 978-1849354622
- OCLC: 11648160038

After the Revolution is a 2022 novel by journalist and podcaster Robert Evans. It is set in North America in 2070, roughly twenty years after a second American Civil War balkanized the United States into various different nations.

== Summary ==
After the Revolution, set in the year 2070, portrays a dystopian future following a civil war that results in the break-up of the United States. Twenty years after the conflict, the narrative centers around the Republic of Texas, where extremist militias vie for control amidst the ruins. The story escalates in the Free City of Austin, which stands threatened by the expansion of a fundamentalist Christian ethnostate known as the "Heavenly Kingdom."

The novel follows three central characters whose paths converge in the turmoil. Manny is a fixer who operates by shuttling journalists through war zones, ensuring news agencies receive their footage. Sasha, a religious young woman from the American Federation, a close successor state to the former United States, initially joins the ranks of the Heavenly Kingdom, only to become disillusioned as she uncovers the grim reality behind their facade. The third protagonist is Roland, a former U.S. Army soldier enhanced with cybernetic technology, whose combat experiences have left him with a scarred psyche and a tally of career kills that haunt him. Their joint efforts form a narrative of resistance against the advancing forces of the Heavenly Kingdom.

== Reception ==
After the Revolution received a positive review from M. L. Clark in Strange Horizons, highlighting its exploration of a dystopian America and its optimistic depiction of community and resilience amidst dark themes. The novel was praised for challenging readers to consider their roles in societal conflicts and for its nuanced take on military culture and transhumanist anarchism.

Joe Streckert of the Portland Mercury, described the book as an action-filled and imaginative take on a future splintered America. Streckert stated the novel's use of familiar character archetypes in an unconventional setting, along with its fast-paced narrative and vivid depiction of a post-civil war United States, was praised. Streckert also highlighted the book's ability to convey political commentary through the personal experiences of its characters, avoiding heavy-handedness while maintaining a thrilling and explosive storyline.

Susan Elizabeth Shepard for Texas Monthly, described the novel as a rich addition to the speculative fiction genre, using Texas as a setting for an apocalyptic future. The review highlights the book's cyberpunk elements and the author's nuanced approach to depicting a divided Texas, with a focus on the state's real-life issues such as climate and political tensions. Shepard notes the novel's underlying optimism about Texan community and adaptability in the face of adversity.

Justine Norton-Kertson of Solarpunk Magazine, gave the book favorable reviews, highlighting its portrayal of a post-apocalyptic America fragmented by civil war and extremist ideologies. The novel was commended for its gripping narrative, multi-perspective storytelling, and its sensitive treatment of the traumas associated with war. Norton-Kertson noted the book's ability to captivate readers and provoke thoughtful reflection on its dystopian world.

== Mentioned areas of the former United States ==
Entity	Description
American Federation (AmFed)	The primary successor state to the U.S. government, centered in the Northeast. It is a corporate capitalist state that maintains a veneer of the "old world" but is heavily influenced by corporate interests. The cities of Boston and Washington D.C. are mentioned. It contests Missouri with the United Christian States.
Great Lakes	An area surrounding the geographic Great Lakes, including all of Michigan and Wisconsin, along with the Iron Range of Minnesota, and parts of Indiana, Ohio, and New York. It is officially claimed by the American Federation, but it is effectively under the protection of Canada. The region operates with a high degree of autonomy.
Blackstone Nation	It controls a significant portion of Illinois, specifically centered around the Chicago metropolitan area, and is run by the descendants of the Blackstone Rangers. It serves as the western border of the American Federation.
Republic of Texas	A weak, libertarian rump state based in Galveston, Texas struggles to maintain control over its territory and is currently a war zone where various militias and factions vie for power. The city of Dallas is referred to as "Ciudad de Muerta" by the main character.
Austin Autonomous Republic	A secular, progressive, left-wing city-state (the "Free City of Austin") that is the focus of the Heavenly Kingdom's invasion. It was previously allied with the Republic of Texas, but by the start of the novel, Austin operates almost entirely as an independent city-state. It serves as a refuge for people fleeing the religious extremism of the Heavenly Kingdom and the authoritarianism of the United Christian States.
The Heavenly Kingdom	A "Christofascist" ethnostate that serves the novel's primary antagonist. Modeled after groups like ISIS, it is an expansionist, fundamentalist Calvinist movement that uses high-tech weaponry and religious zeal to seize territory in the plains and North Texas.
United Christian States (UCS)	A Southern fundamentalist bloc, it includes the states of Alabama, Arkansas, Florida, Georgia, Mississippi, North Carolina, South Carolina, and Tennessee. It contests the territory of Missouri with the American Federation. While deeply Christian, they are depicted as distinct from the more radical and violent Heavenly Kingdom.
Kansas	Only briefly mentioned in the book, Kansas is portrayed as an ungoverned frontier region between the failing AmFed and the Heavenly Kingdom, and is one of the major recruiting grounds for the radical neo-Calvinist insurgent group. The book implies that the socioeconomic collapse of the "Breadbasket" allowed the HK to radicalize the remaining population in across the former Midwest states.
Oklahoma	A stable, independent territory dominated by the Choctaw Nation and governed by an Indigenous confederation. Characters describe the region as being relatively peaceful and isolationist, with the Red River mentioned as a "hard border" contrasted to the chaos of Texas.
Louisiana	A haven for refugees while also retaining its traditional Catholic identity, Louisiana is generally depicted as an independent state beyond the control of the UCS, which controls the rest of the Deep South. Travelers must typically use boats or aircraft to reach Louisiana without crossing the hostile territory of the Christian extremists.
California Republic	A stable corporate state with strong social welfare programs. However, its central authority is largely limited to the southern and coastal regions, with little control north of Oakland. Characters in the book occasionally refer to California as an "authoritarian police state" with a high degree of surveillance.
Cascadia	A secular, relatively stable nation occupying the Pacific Northwest, it recently concluded its own internal civil war after seceding from the larger "Coastal Pact" with California. Based in the former states of Oregon and Washington, its central authority is largely limited to the coastal regions west of the Willamette Valley, with little control over Eastern Oregon; it also claims control of the Idaho panhandle and some sectors of Western Montana.
Idaho	No longer a unified entity, Idaho is contested territory between Cascadia and Deseret. The panhandle is described as semi-independent but within the Cascadian sphere of influence, while the Snake River Basin is under Mormon control. Idaho is called a "quiet" zone because it lacks the intense frontline conflict seen south in Texas, with the region settling into a tense stability between established religious and secular powers.
Deseret	Referred to as "Mormonland" by most characters in the book, the region exists as a religious enclave with power contested between two factions, the LDS Mainstream and Fundamentalist Splinters. It controls most of Utah (except San Juan County) and northeastern Nevada. The region remains a hub for heavy industry and mining.
Kingdom of Albuquerque	Described as a post-collapse autocracy centered in Albuquerque, it is one of the more colorful and mysterious regional powers mentioned in the world-building, though it primarily exists on the periphery of the main plot. While many other regions (like the Heavenly Kingdom or Mormonland) are defined by established religions, the Kingdom of Albuquerque appears to be a secular or cult-of-personality warlord state. There are passing references to the Kingdom’s methods of control being particularly grisly; rumors mentioned by characters suggest that boiling people alive is a common punishment or interrogation tactic used by the King’s forces.
Navajo Nation	Unlike the failing "rump states" like the Republic of Texas, the Navajo Nation is depicted as a cohesive and functional entity, successfully asserting its independence after the collapse of the U.S. Its primary adversary is the Kingdom of Albuquerque to the east, with the two locked in a tense "hot border" conflict. Lore from the author suggests the Navajo were better prepared for the "Post-U.S." reality because they already had a sophisticated tribal government and a history of self-reliance in a rugged environment that many outside forces found difficult to occupy. They are noted for having a capable military force that has successfully fended off both Albuquerque and various "AmFed" remnants seeking to assert dominance.
