= Airliners.net =

Aviation online photographic database

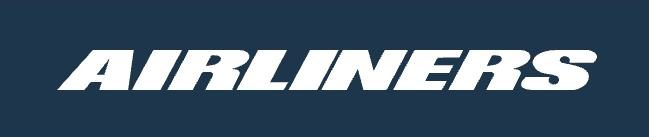

- Screenshot Airliners.net homepage
- Website type: Aircraft photo database, aviation forum
- Owner: VerticalScope
- Creators: Johan Lundgren, Jr.
- Revenue: Advertising
- Website: www.airliners.net
- Commercial: Yes
- Launched: May 23, 1997; 29 years ago
- Current status: Active

Airliners.net is an aviation website that includes an extensive photo database of aircraft and airports, as well as a forum catering to aviation enthusiasts. Founded by Johan Lundgren, Jr. in Sweden, the site originated in 1996 as Pictures of Modern Airliners. It was acquired by the US company Demand Media (now known as Leaf Group) in 2007, and underwent a major redesign in 2016.

== History ==
Johan Lundgren, Jr., an IT student/aviation enthusiast attending Luleå University of Technology in Sweden, created the site Pictures of Modern Airliners in 1996. Lundgren had been working on the site during his military service. It initially hosted only his own aircraft photos before a new section was created for other photographers to upload their photos.

In 1997, Lundgren transitioned to a new site entitled Airliners.net and established a web server in his dormitory room. Three more servers were added, and eventually all servers were relocated to the computer rooms at the university. Lundgren started investing all of his time into the site, although he received help from a growing number of volunteers.

On 27 July 2007, Lundgren announced that the site would be acquired by Demand Media. It was sold to the company for US$8.2 million. Reasons behind the decision included the difficulty of managing the rapidly growing site, which was by that point supported by 25 servers.

As you probably know, Airliners.net keeps growing year after year with more photos, more forum posts, more visitors, more users and more photographers. This is fantastic. I could never in my wildest dreams have imagined this success when I started the site ten years ago.

And what comes with success?? Managing it. And I know you have felt some of the growing pains. There are infrastructure issues – like trying to stay on top of the hardware needs of this site but complexities and the site’s growth have caused outages. What started in my dorm room on one computer is now supported by 25 – and that’s not including all the network gear.

And there are administrative issues. Growing the site, supporting the community and keeping things running takes a big toll on me – All Crew groups have long lists of bugs I need to fix and administrative features I need to add.

— Johan Lundgren, Jr., "Big News On The Future Of Airliners.net"

A revamped site was launched on 14 June 2016.

In February 2017, the site was acquired by VerticalScope.

== Features ==
The site has two main features: the photo database and the forum. The database contains over 2.7 million photos with over 8.6 billion total views as of June 2016.

== See also ==
- List of Internet forums
