= Islands (magazine) =

American travel publication

- Categories: Travel magazine
- Frequency: Bimonthly
- Founder: David Fritzen
- Founded: 1981
- Company: Static Media
- Country: United States
- Based in: Santa Barbara, California
- Language: English
- Website: islands.com

Islands is an American online travel publication and former print magazine focused on global island destinations. Founded in 1981 in Santa Barbara, California, it operated as a bimonthly print publication for 35 years before transitioning to a digital-only format in the 2010s. It is owned by Static Media.

== History ==
Islands was founded as an independent magazine in 1981 under the ownership of Islands Media in Santa Barbara, California. The publication was founded by David Fritzen. By the late 1990s, the magazine was acquired by the Florida-based publisher World Publications.

In 2007, the Swedish media group Bonnier AB acquired World Publications, incorporating Islands into the newly formed Bonnier Corp. In late 2012, Bonnier Corp integrated the content of its discontinued Caribbean Travel + Life magazine into Islands.

By 2014, the publication ceased its regular print editions and transitioned to a digital-only model, operating via Islands.com, a domain that had been registered in 2000. In February 2024, Static Media Inc. acquired the magazine.

== Content ==
Islands covers island destinations, tropical travel, and related lifestyle topics. Historically, the print edition featured first-person travel narratives, destination guides, and photo essays.

The magazine published recurring features, including a "Best Islands to Live On" ranking, which evaluated destinations based on factors such as community and convenience. Additional coverage areas included ecotourism, cruise itineraries, and destination weddings. Following its transition to a digital format, the platform continued to provide destination guides and trip-planning resources.

== Editors ==
David Fritzen served as the founding publisher and initial editorial director. In the late 1980s, Joan Tapper was appointed editor-in-chief, a position she held for 13 years.

During the 2000s and early 2010s, under Bonnier Corp ownership, Sawyer and Shawn Bean served as editors. During this period, editorial operations were based in Winter Park, Florida.

== Awards and recognition ==
During its print circulation, Islands received multiple Lowell Thomas Travel Journalism Awards, including four awards in the 2010 competition for travel writing and photography. The publication also received "Maggie" Awards from the Western Publishing Association for editorial and design work.
