= Wayne Gladstone =

American writer, humorist and novelist

- Born: United States
- Occupations: Humorist, novelist
- Writing career
- Pen name: Gladstone
- Language: English
- Period: Contemporary
- Genres: Satire, dystopian
- Subjects: Pop culture, news media, Americana
- Notable work: Notes from the Internet Apocalypse

Wayne Gladstone (also known as Gladstone) is an American writer, humorist and novelist best known for his work with Cracked.com, his web show Hate By Numbers, and the novel Notes from the Internet Apocalypse, the first in a trilogy of books entitled The Internet Apocalypse Trilogy.

Following the release of Notes from the Internet Apocalypse, Gladstone has been interviewed on the internet's effect on pop culture by Esquire, as well as appearing on Fusion.net in an interview hypothesizing the societal effects of the disappearance of the Internet.

The second novel in Gladstone's Internet apocalypse trilogy, Agents of the Internet Apocalypse, was released on July 21, 2015.

The third novel in Gladstone's Internet apocalypse trilogy, Reports on the Internet Apocalypse, was released on November 1, 2016.

Gladstone received a B.A. in English from Cornell University in 1995 and earned a J.D. from Fordham University in 1999.
