= Ning (website) =

Online platform for people and organizations to create custom social networks

Ning, Inc.
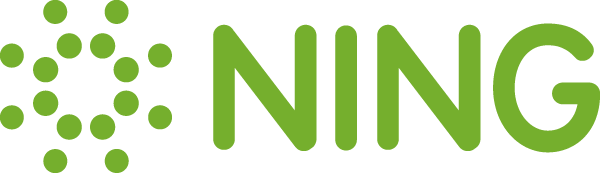
- Company type: Subsidiary
- Available in: Multilingual
- Founded: Palo Alto, California (2004)
- Headquarters: Palo Alto, California, U.S.
- Founders: Gina Bianchini; Marc Andreessen
- Employees: > 50 (2014)
- Website: www.ning.com
- Launched: October 2005

Ning is an online social media network platform for people and organizations to create custom social networks. Ning was co-founded by Marc Andreessen and Gina Bianchini and launched in October 2005. By June 2011 there were over 90,000 social websites running on the Ning Platform.

== History ==
Ning started development in October 2004 and launched its platform publicly in October 2005.

At its launch, Ning was a free-form platform for the development and hosting of open-source "social applications". The source code for Ning applications was available to users so that anyone could fork a Ning application, modify its PHP code and run it as their own. In late September 2006, Ning narrowed its focus to offering a group website, a photos website, and a videos website for people to copy and use for any purpose. These three templates were later superseded by a single customizable application aimed at enabling anyone to easily create their own social network.

Ning was initially funded internally by Bianchini, Andreessen and angel investors. In July 2007, Ning raised US$44 million in venture capital, led by Legg Mason. In 2008 and 2009, the company announced it had raised an additional US$75 million in capital.

On April 15, 2010, CEO Jason Rosenthal announced that the free service would be suspended, and 41% of the employees would be laid off. Users of the free service had the option to either upgrade to a paid account or transition their content from Ning. In 2011, Ning was purchased by Glam Media and then officially acquired by Mode Media.

== Features ==
Ning allows users to create their own communities and social networks around specific interests with their own visual design, choice of features and member data. Ning provides several core features, including opportunities for monetization, integration with other social networks, chat, email services, forums, polls and analytics. Customers are also able to map a Ning social network to a custom domain.

The social networks running on Ning's service are programmed with PHP and the platform itself is built in Java. Since October 2010, social networks using Ning can be administered through an iOS application.

In February 2018, Ning launched a monetization platform, enabling users to earn an income from their social websites.

== See also ==
- BuddyPress
- Drupal
- Google Groups
- Yahoo! Groups
