= Content farm =

Organization that creates web content optimised for views

Unusual YouTube upload activity of a content farm.

A content farm or content mill is an organization focused on generating a large amount of web content, often specifically designed to satisfy algorithms for maximal retrieval by search engines, a practice known as search engine optimization (SEO). Such organizations often employ freelance creators or, since 2022, use generative AI tools, with the goal of generating large amounts of content in the shortest time and for the lowest cost. The primary goal is to attract as many page views as possible, and thus generate more advertising revenue, at the cost of the accuracy of information. The emergence of these media outlets is often tied to the demand for "true market demand" content based on search engine queries. Content farms have been criticized for producing misinformation.

== History ==
The rise of the digital advertising industry incentivized the rise of content farms. Digital advertising revenue is typically proportional to the number of people who have seen an advert, meaning that websites which host advertisements are incentivized to attract as many visitors as possible. Techniques like clickbait (misrepresenting the content of a web page in order to draw in viewers) may be used to attract traffic to the often low quality content published by content farms. Whether a visitor is satisfied with the content or not, the content farm receives a small amount of advertising revenue for each such visit. This model has encouraged the creation of content farms by offering them a means to financial success. Although any individual page may not be of interest to internet users, a content farm may still attract many viewers and be able to place many adverts across an enormous number of total web pages, bringing in a large amount of revenue while minimizing costs.

== Characteristics ==
Some content farms produce thousands of articles each month using freelance writers or AI tools. For example, in 2009, Wired reported that Demand Media, owner of eHow, was publishing one million items per month, the equivalent of four English-language Wikipedias annually. Another notable example was Associated Content, purchased by Yahoo! in 2010 for $90 million, which later became Yahoo! Voices before shutting down in 2014.

Pay scales for writers at content farms are low compared to historical salaries. For instance, writers may be paid $3.50 per article, though some prolific contributors can produce enough content to earn a living. Writers are often not experts in the topics they cover.

Since the rise of large language models like ChatGPT, content farms have shifted towards AI-generated content. A report by NewsGuard in 2023 identified over 140 internationally recognized brands supporting AI-driven content farms. AI tools allow these sites to generate hundreds of articles daily, often with minimal human oversight.

Due to their already established Google search ranking, pre-existing reputable news sites may be purchased by content farm operators and converted into part of the content farm network, greatly degrading editorial practices in the process, or alternatively the URLs of defunct sites or those who forgot to pay for domain renewal may be cybersquatted by content farm operators.

== Criticism ==
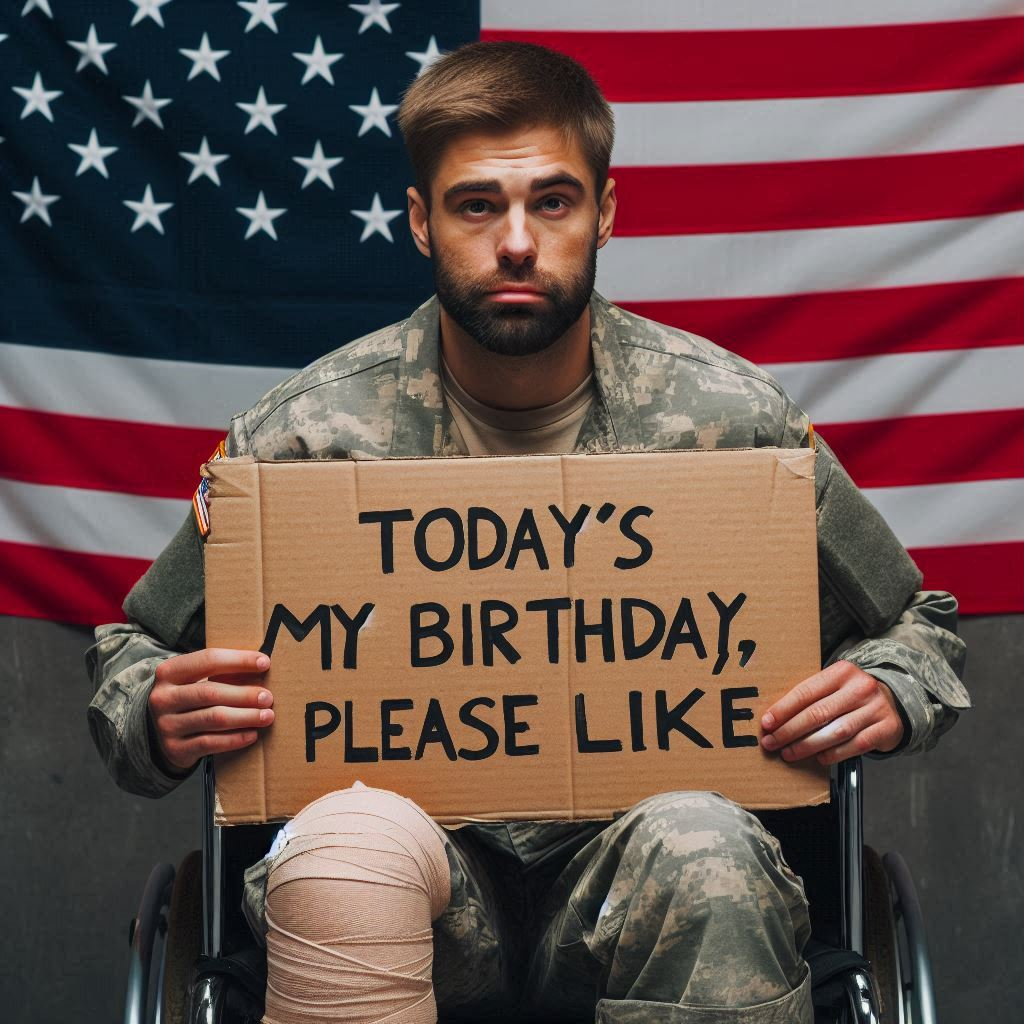
AI-generated content is often common on content farm channels.

Critics argue that content farms prioritize SEO and ad revenue over factual accuracy and relevance. Critics also highlight the potential for misinformation, such as conspiracy theories and fake product reviews, being spread through AI-generated content. Some have compared content farms to the fast food industry, calling them "fast content" providers that pollute the web with low-value material. The word "sponsored" displayed when searching has raised questions on the reliability of the site, as it was likely paid to be pushed to the top of the search options.

== Search engine responses ==
Google attempted to lower the rankings of low-quality websites with its Panda update in 2011. DuckDuckGo implemented measures to block low-quality AI-driven sites in 2024.

== See also ==
- Brain rot
- Italian brainrot
- Click farm
- Elsagate
- Enshittification
- Misinformation
- Spamdexing
