= CoverItLive =

Social media platform

CoveritLive was a social media platform that let brands, media companies, individuals and small organizations share real, virtual and hybrid events online. CoveritLive provided a "second screen" experience for televised events, or primary coverage of a sports, news or entertainment event. It also provided live social streams and social walls. It was founded by Keith McSpurren who also co-founded Salesdriver.com with Joel Silver. CoveritLive ceased its service offering effective December 31, 2018.

== Company history ==
In January 2009, CoveritLive secured $1 million in a first round of funding (from seed investor Flagstone Capital and private investor Paul Kedrosky). In August 2009, California-based Demand Media made a strategic investment and acquired a minority stake in CoveritLive; Demand Media said it would offer services to customers of its Pluck enterprise social media platform, which include Sky News, NPR, USA Today and the NFL. In February 2011, CoveritLive was acquired by Demand Media for an undisclosed sum.

CoveritLive was used to cover events including the May 2010 UK General Election, the NFL Draft, American Idol, the Tour de France and other cycling events (via Velo News) and the 2010 FIFA World Cup (during which it claimed 146 million page views in 30 days).

The service crashed temporarily during 27 January 2010 due to a massive surge of interest in journalists' feeds using CoverItLive to report Steve Jobs' keynote at Apple's launch of its iPad device. Online publications using CoveritLive for this event included MacWorld and MacNN.
