= Daniel O'Brien (comedian) =

American actor

- Born: January 6, 1986 (age 40); Hazlet, New Jersey
- Education: Rutgers University
- Occupations: Writer, actor, comedian, humorist, author, songwriter
- Writing career
- Pen name: DOB
- Language: English
- Genre: Humor
- Subjects: pop culture, history
- Notable work: How to Fight Presidents

Daniel O'Brien (born January 6, 1986), also known as "DOB", is an American humorist, author and songwriter; formerly for Cracked.com. In August 2018, O'Brien started as a staff writer on the HBO show Last Week Tonight with John Oliver, and is currently a senior writer. From 2019 through 2025, he was part of the writing team that won seven Emmy Awards for Outstanding Writing on a Variety Series.

== Early life ==
Daniel grew up in Hazlet, New Jersey, where he attended Raritan High School. He later attended Rutgers University in New Jersey. His college job as a bartender was the inspiration for his unpublished online novel, Bartender. His uncle was actor Skip O'Brien.

== Cracked writer ==
In 2007, O'Brien started working for Cracked.com as senior writer and editor. O'Brien has written over 200 articles for the site that have been seen more than 50 million times. Starting around 2009, his articles on Cracked were published as a column called "Dan Dan Revolution".

O'Brien's writing encompasses a range from politics to pop culture. O'Brien mocked himself, such as in the sketch "Mug of Pens: The Coffee Mug (For Your Pens)", which also became popular on YouTube. He presents a fictional persona as a socially awkward pop culture enthusiast who openly admits to loving fictional characters, including Spider-Man, far more than his real friends. O'Brien has written about Spider-Man several times, such as "Proposed Script for Spider-Man 4: The Grittiest Reboot Ever", "Why Spider-Man Is a Dick", and "3 Insane Spider-Man Movies You Won't Believe Almost Got Made".

On December 4, 2017, after 10 years of working with Cracked, O'Brien tweeted, "I no longer work for Cracked.com." following the extensive staff layoffs at Cracked.

== Agents of Cracked and Cracked After Hours ==
O'Brien and Michael Swaim had become the faces of Cracked, after starring in its many original web series like Agents of Cracked and Cracked After Hours.

Agents of Cracked premiered in November 2009, and the first 13 episodes were viewed nearly 4 million times. After its first season, the series won the Audience Choice Award at the 2010 Streamy Awards. Agents of Cracked was renewed in October 2010 and ran for another 13 episodes, followed the next year by a third season of 10 episodes. To date, the series has been seen more than 20 million times.

Some of the material that ends up in the Agents of Cracked is based on real events, including an incident where Dan is confronted by Secret Service after writing an article titled "How to Kidnap the President's Daughter."

O'Brien also co-wrote, produced and acted in Cracked's series Cracked After Hours, which has been seen more than 15 million times and was the host of Cracked's video series "Obsessive Pop-Culture Disorder" and, as an actor, played secondary characters in various webseries of the site.

== Other work ==
O'Brien continues to work on other projects. In 2012, he revealed an upcoming book entitled How To Fight Presidents, which was purchased by Crown Publishing Group (Random House). This followed such articles as "The 5 Most Badass Presidents of All Time" and "How to Fight Andrew Jackson: The Deadliest President Ever" The book was published March 18, 2014, full title How to Fight Presidents: Defending Yourself Against the Badasses Who Ran This Country and was illustrated by Winston Rowntree. The book, in addition to analyzing the strengths and weaknesses of every then-deceased president of the United States through Ronald Reagan, includes a brief summary of their life and term as president and goes into some detail, much of it speculative, concerning the genitals of said presidents. O'Brien uses a conversational tone and breaks the fourth wall repeatedly by referencing himself directly and by praising himself and the book in the third person.

He was also a writer and editor on Cracked's The New York Times bestselling book You Might Be a Zombie and Other Bad News. He was also featured on the History Channel's Your Bleeped Up Brain and in the music video for "The OCDance!" by Rachel Bloom.

In August 2018 O'Brien announced he had been hired as a staff writer on the HBO show Last Week Tonight with John Oliver.

In May 2019 O'Brien launched a free weekly podcast with friend and former Cracked coworker Soren Bowie, called Quick Question With Soren And Daniel, during which they discuss random topics by asking each other questions.

O'Brien and his fellow writers for Last Week Tonight with John Oliver have won seven Emmys, for Outstanding Writing on a Variety Series.

== See also ==
- Jason Pargin – American novelist and humorist (born 1975)
- Seanbaby – American writer and video-game designer (born 1976)
- Michael Swaim – American actor
