= TheTakeout =

American online magazine

The Takeout
- Categories: Food and drink
- First issue: November 15, 2017; 8 years ago
- Company: Static Media
- Country: United States
- Based in: Chicago, Illinois
- Language: English
- Website: thetakeout.com

The Takeout is an American online magazine focused on food, drink, and their relationship to popular culture. Based in Chicago, it has developed a readership for its straightforward, conversational approach to culinary topics. Originally part of Fusion Media Group under Univision, The Takeout later became part of G/O Media. Since 2024, it has been owned by Static Media.

== History ==
The Takeout was launched on November 15, 2017, as a non-satirical spinoff of The A.V. Club’s food coverage. It was originally published by Fusion Media Group, a division of Univision Communications, with Kevin Pang, a former Chicago Tribune food writer, as its editor-in-chief.

In 2019, Univision sold Gizmodo Media Group to private equity firm Great Hill Partners, reorganizing the properties under G/O Media. Following the transition, Pang stepped down in October 2019 and was succeeded as editor-in-chief by Marnie Shure, a former editor at The Onion. Under her leadership, the site continued its focus on a wide range of American food topics. The staff remained relatively small and was unionized as part of the Onion Union with the Writers Guild of America East.

In March 2024, G/O Media sold The Takeout to Indianapolis-based digital publisher Static Media, which integrated it into its other food-focused websites, including Tasting Table and The Daily Meal.

== Coverage ==
The Takeout covers a broad range of food-related topics, including fast-food news, grocery products, restaurant industry developments, culinary history, recipes, and food trends in popular culture. Content formats include news articles, guides, reviews, and feature stories. While factual in nature, articles often use a conversational style.

The magazine publishes a mix of short-form news items, list-based articles, and longer features. Regular features once included advice columns such as The Salty Waitress, product reviews, and explanatory pieces on food science. It also reports on the intersection of food and entertainment, including foods associated with films, television, and social media trends.

== Editors ==
Kevin Pang served as The Takeout's first editor-in-chief from 2017 to 2019. Prior to launching the site, Pang was a James Beard Award-winning food journalist at the Chicago Tribune. During his tenure, he established the site's editorial direction and contributed articles, including writing the advice column The Salty Waitress under a pseudonym.

Marnie Shure succeeded Pang as editor-in-chief in October 2019. She previously served as deputy managing editor at The Onion and had contributed to The Takeout since its early period.
