= Static Media =

American internet company

- Type: Private
- Industry: Internet
- Founded: 2012; 14 years ago
- Founders: Reggie Renner; Mike Langin
- Headquarters: Fishers, Indiana, United States
- Area served: Worldwide
- Key people: Reggie Renner (CEO); Mike Langin (CTO); Brian White (COO); Pete Schieke (CCO); Joe Bossone (CFO); Claye Stokes (CGO); Karen Miner (CSO)
- Brands: BGR; Engadget; Garden Guides; Mom.com; PlanetWare; The Daily Meal; The Takeout; TVLine; Looper; Nicki Swift; Mashed; The List; /Film; Glam; Grunge; SlashGear; Health Digest; Tasting Table; SVG; House Digest; WrestlingInc; Food Republic; Explore; Women; Foodie; Money Digest; Outdoor Guide; Chowhound; Islands; Hunker; Cuteness; Sciencing; Jalopnik; CarScoops
- Website: static.com

Static Media Inc. is an American digital media company that owns and operates over 30 websites covering entertainment, food, lifestyle, technology, automotive, travel, and health. It is based in Fishers, Indiana.

== History ==
=== Early history ===
Static Media was founded by Reggie Renner and Mike Langin. The two met online while playing MMO games and later worked together in domain trading. In 2011, they launched ZergNet, a content recommendation network incorporated as 7Hops.com Inc. Initially, ZergNet operated on a reciprocal traffic-exchange model.

In 2012, Mark Cuban invested in the company. In November 2014, the company raised $3.2 million in Series A financing led by Greycroft and Bertelsmann Digital Media Investments, with Cuban also participating.

In 2015, Static Media launched Looper and Grunge, with Looper as its flagship publication. In 2016, the company launched three original publications, Mashed, Nicki Swift, and The List. In 2017, it founded another original publication, SVG. In 2020, Static Media founded Health Digest. In November 2020, the company moved its headquarters from Noblesville to Fishers. In 2021, Static Media acquired Tasting Table and /Film. In the same year, the company also launched the original home and garden focused publication House Digest. In 2022, Static Media acquired Wrestling Inc. and Glam. Static Media also acquired The Daily Meal, which launched in 2011. In November 2022, Static Media launched Explore, an original travel-focused publication. In 2023, Static Media acquired Women.com, which was originally founded in 1995. In the same year, Static Media also acquired Food Republic, which was originally launched in 2011.

=== Novacap investment and expansion ===
In April 2023, Montreal-based private equity firm Novacap invested in Static Media through its TMT VI fund. Static Media launched Foodie in September 2023, followed by its first financial publication, Money Digest, on October 3. Later that month, it launched Outdoor Guide, an original publication covering outdoor living and gardening. In November 2023, Static Media relaunched Chowhound, a food website founded in 1997 that had ceased publication in 2022.

In 2024, Static Media relaunched Islands, a travel publication focused on destinations, cruises, and resorts, and acquired Cuteness from Leaf Group. Islands originated as a print magazine in 1981, launched a website in 2000, and became digital-only after its print edition ceased publication in 2014. Also, in 2024, Static Media acquired home and design site Hunker from World of Good Brands. In March 2024, it acquired The Takeout from G/O Media. In October 2024, G/O Media agreed to sell automotive publication Jalopnik to Static Media, with the deal closing in early 2025. In November 2024, Static Media launched Sciencing under its ownership. The science, mathematics, and technology website had operated since 2006. In 2025, Static Media acquired BGR and TVLine from Penske Media Corporation. It also acquired Garden Guides, a gardening site launched in 1998, and PlanetWare, a travel site launched in 1995. In 2026, Static Media acquired technology publication Engadget from Yahoo!.. In June 2026, Static Media acquired the Mom.com domain name from Bright Mountain Media for $1.1 million.

== Owned or associated websites ==
Static Media owns and operates the following websites:

- BGR – tech, science, and entertainment
- CarScoops – automotive news and opinion
- Chowhound – food, recipes, and cooking
- Cuteness – pet
- Engadget – technology
- Explore – travel
- /Film – film news and reviews
- Food Republic – food, recipes, and reviews
- Foodie – food and cooking
- Garden Guides – gardening, landscaping, and plant care
- Glam – beauty, fashion, wellness, and lifestyle
- Grunge – music
- Health Digest – health and wellness
- House Digest – home and garden
- Hunker – home and garden
- Islands – travel
- Jalopnik – automotive news and opinion
- Looper – film and television
- Mashed – food
- Money Digest – finance
- Nicki Swift – celebrity news and entertainment
- Outdoor Guide – outdoor living and gardening
- PlanetWare – travel guides and tips
- Sciencing – science, math, and technology
- SlashGear – automotive, technology, and digital lifestyle
- SVG – video games
- Tasting Table – food and recipes
- The Daily Meal – food and drinks
- The List – women's lifestyle and celebrities
- The Takeout – food news and reviews
- TVLine – television news and reviews
- Women.com – women's lifestyle
- Wrestling Inc – pro wrestling and combat sports
