= EHow =

Website

eHow

- Screenshot
- Website type: Content farm
- Available in: English
- Owner: Leaf Group
- Website: eHow.com
- Commercial: Yes
- Registration: Yes
- Launched: March 1999; 27 years ago
- Current status: Active

eHow is a website that provides instructions on a variety of topics. Any eHow user can leave comments or responses, but only contracted writers can contribute changes to articles. The writers work on a freelance basis, being paid by article. eHow is frequently called a content farm.

== History ==
Old logo, used until 2011

Logo used 2011-2016

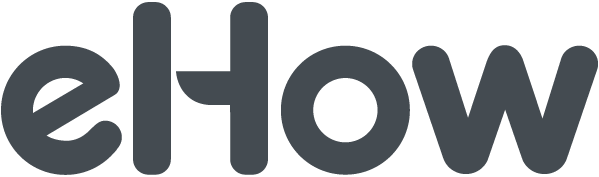
Previous logo

eHow was founded by Courtney Rosen in 1999. On 8 February 2001 it filed for Chapter 7 bankruptcy. At that time it had $1.16 million in assets and $7.2 million in debts and had used up $23.5 million in venture capital funding in a year and a half that came from companies including Hummer Winblad Venture Partners ($1.3 million) and Dominion Ventures ($982,035). eHow's major debts included $598,460 owed to Vignette Corp., $140,024 to Engage Media in San Francisco and $237,492 to LifeMinders. The Silicon Valley Bank seized $180,548 that was in EHow's accounts to pay off outstanding loans. eHow was acquired by Demand Media in 2006. Originally it was a source of written articles and step-by-step instructions. At the time of its acquisition it had 17,000 articles and 5.8 million visitors a month. A year after purchasing the website Demand Media introduced the video format. In 2008 the site won a Mashable Blogger's Choice award in the 2nd Annual Open Web Awards.

In 2009 the website introduced a mobile version for cell phone users and also was a CNET Webware 100 Winner in the category of Search & Reference. That same year Demand Media merged their acquisition of Expert Village into eHow and opened a branch operation in the United Kingdom. The moves gave eHow over one million articles and videos available on-line in 2009 and doubled that number by the following year. In 2010 they received a New Media Award.

It was in 2009 that eHow was noted as having changed its method of identifying content to contract for creation. The company moved from human-identified lists of potential content to the use of a computer-based algorithm, a move that increased revenue by a factor of 4.9 times per article or video created. Getting rid of the human editors who formerly identified and approved content to be produced increased profits for the company by a factor of 20–25 times. The automated program combines search data, internet traffic patterns and the rates of keyword use and uses this information to determine what internet users want to know and also calculates how much money advertisers will pay to appear on the same page content created. Another algorithm, called the Knowledge Engine, then works out what exactly internet users want to know about the subjects identified and details exactly how to approach profitable subjects and what its potential subject longevity is. The machine-created subjects are then proofread by freelance proofreaders for 8 cents each, to ensure that they are clear enough for bidding on by freelance article and video producers. Content producers are then paid about US$15 per article or US$20 per video to produce the product. This change resulted in the Demand Media making an estimated US$200 million in revenue in 2009, including from Google's advertising income.

In 2011 the site released an iPad application, providing a direct shortcut to the website. That same year the site received a reorganization and overhaul of its look, consolidating its now three million articles and videos into six categories: Home, Health, Food, Style, Money and Family. In 2011 the site was adding more than 5,000 articles and videos a day while employing 13,000 freelance writers, editors and producers. In 2012 a seventh category was added, entitled Mom, focusing on parenting and family issues.

== Criticisms ==
Demand Media and eHow in particular have been criticized for large amounts of low-quality content and for operating as a content farm, paying contributors low rates for content intended to rank high in search results, rather than focus on quality information, with poor quality articles intended mainly to drive up search results rather than inform.

In 2010 and 2011 Google implemented changes to their algorithms intending to reduce the ranking and impact of content farms. These changes led to a 40% drop in traffic to Demand Media sites. Demand Media responded to the algorithm changes, saying their business model remained solid.

Jack Herrick, former owner of eHow, started up wikiHow after concluding that the wiki method of content creation would ultimately produce higher quality work. He described the difference between eHow and wikiHow as "eating a McDonald's burger vs. a wonderful, home cooked meal"

Search engine DuckDuckGo's CEO Gabriel Weinberg has criticized eHow, along with other Demand Media websites, labeling the company a "content mill," because of the website's search engine driven content, low article quality and low writer salaries. DuckDuckGo filters out eHow content because of Weinberg's perception that Demand Media produces low-quality content designed specifically to rank highly in Google Searches for the purposes of promoting advertising.

Another search engine, Blekko also regarded eHow as spam, blacklisted the site and filtered eHow results out.

Wired magazine has also criticized eHow and Demand Media, calling their content: "slapdash" and a "factory stamping out moneymaking content".
