= Seanbaby =

American writer and video-game designer (born 1976)

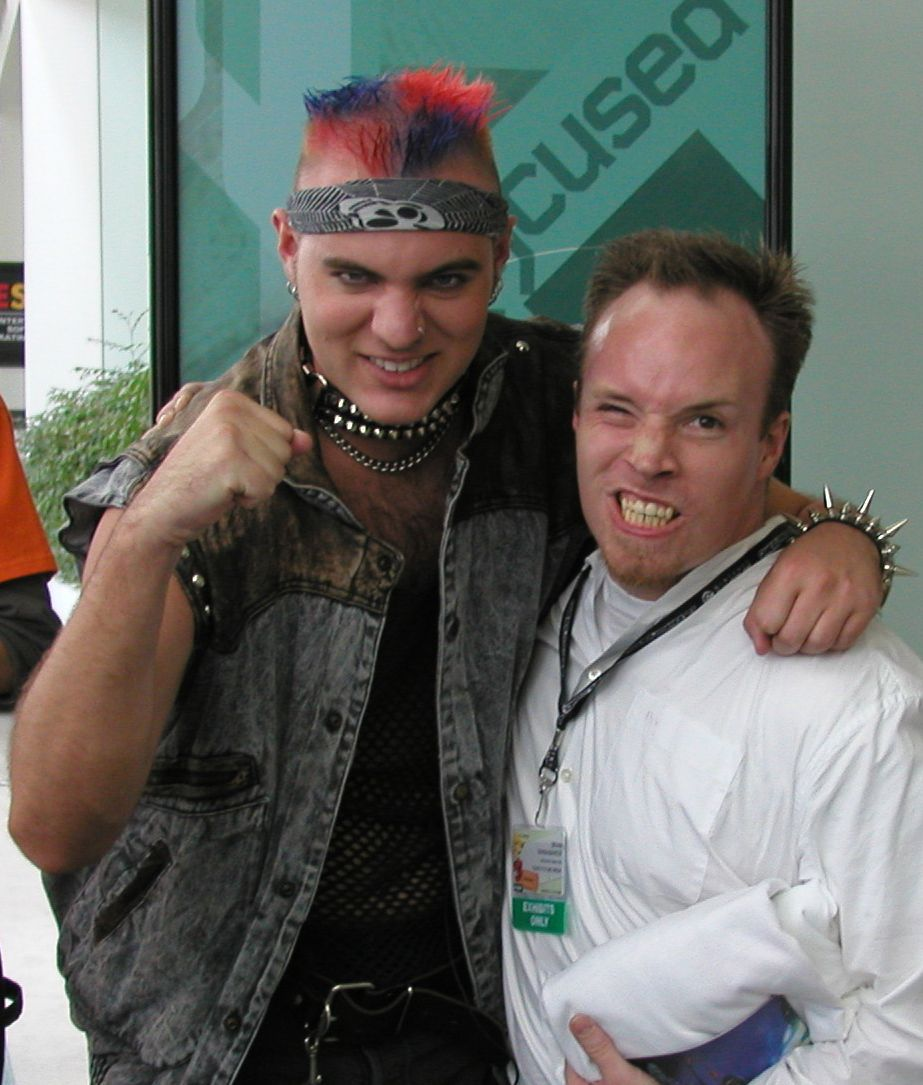
- Seanbaby, on the left, at E3 in 2003 with a fan
- Born: Sean Patrick Reiley; June 15, 1976 (age 50)
- Education: University of Idaho
- Occupations: Comedy writer, columnist
- Writing career
- Genres: Satire, fratire, comedy
- Website: seanbaby.com

Sean Patrick Reiley (born June 15, 1976), better known as Seanbaby, is an American writer and video-game designer best known for his comedy website and frequent contributions to video game media outlets Electronic Gaming Monthly and 1UP.com, as well as the humor website Cracked.com.

== Writing career ==
Seanbaby's original website houses many reviews of old video games, a substantial section on the old Super-Friends cartoon, critiques on old DC comics, a collection of Hostess Pie ads (with commentary), sarcastic commentary on Christian fundamentalists and hipsters, examples of poorly translated English, reviews of bad movies and comics, ineffective or overblown self-defense techniques, current events, and a photo gallery of himself with friends.

Seanbaby was a frequent writer for Electronic Gaming Monthly. In addition to his reviews and other content, he wrote a monthly column concerning bad games entitled "Rest of The Crap." He was a frequent contributor on the popular gaming website 1UP.com, where his EGM work was posted. He provides commentary on bad games for 1UP's Broken Pixels show. He also wrote a column called "The Final Last Word" for The Wave magazine of Silicon Valley.

He was also a writer for the short-lived MTV2 animated comedy show The Adventures of Chico and Guapo. He has returned to regularly updating seanbaby.com and began writing as a columnist for Cracked.com. Apart from the typical "listicles" of Cracked.com, Seanbaby's articles also include parodical comics, usually golden-age comicbooks with altered dialogue, and the running gag of 1930's ice-cream mascot "Popsicle Pete" being characterized as a supernatural monster. In 2020, he and fellow Cracked veteran Robert Brockway began publishing comedy articles on the Patreon-supported 1-900-HOTDOG where they also produce a weekly podcast, the Dogg Zzone 9000. Seanbaby and Brockway and Jason Pargin also created the 'Bigfeets' podcast, recapping the television show Mountain Monsters.

== Calculords ==
Seanbaby is the creator of the mobile game Calculords, which combines elements of lane attack, collectible card games, and math puzzles. According to Sean, "Calculords is a weird idea that I'd never get to see unless I made it".

A sequel, Calculords 2: Rise of the Shadow Nerd, has been announced.

== Filmography ==
=== Radio ===
- The ATHENA Superpower Hour: KUOI 89.3 FM; Moscow, Idaho; 1998 (co-host)

=== Television appearances ===
- Electronic Gaming Monthly Special: The 15 Best Games of the Millennium and Their Sequels, MTV (host)
- Video Game Vixens, G4 (judge)
- Attack of the Show, G4 (guest host)
- G4tv.com, G4 (guest host)
- Top Ten Best and Worst Videogames, MTV (guest)

== See also ==
- Daniel O'Brien
- Jason Pargin
- Kittenpants
- Michael Swaim
