= Cracked.com =

American entertainment website, offshoot of Cracked magazine

Cracked
- Website type: Entertainment, comedy
- Available in: English
- Predecessor: Cracked magazine
- Headquarters: United States
- Country of origin: United States
- Owner: Literally Media
- Website: cracked.com
- Launched: November 2005; 21 years ago

Cracked.com is an American website that was based on Cracked magazine. It was founded in 2005 by Jack O'Brien.

In 2007, Cracked had a couple of hundred thousand unique users per month and three or four million page views. In June 2011, it reached 27 million page views, according to comscore. According to O'Brien, the site had about 17 million unique visitors and 300 million page views in February 2012.

== History ==
Former Cracked.com logo, used from the website's launch until May 3rd, 2024

Cracked was founded as a magazine in 1958. In early 2005, its owner Dick Kulpa sold the magazine to a group of investors who announced plans to revive a print version of Cracked with a new editorial focus and redesign.

In October 2005, Cracked.com launched as a separate website under editor-in-chief Jack O'Brien, a former ABC News producer. Although the magazine folded soon after launch, the Cracked website gained popularity and was purchased by Demand Media in June 2007, setting off Cracked's rapid growth period.

In 2007, Cracked had a few hundred thousand unique users per month and three to four million page views. The site fit well within Demand Media's network, with Jack O'Brien noting "They understand the web, and they made us nail down a voice". The editorial staff includes original editor-in-chief Jack O'Brien, Jason Pargin (under his pen name, David Wong), founder of website PWOT, who was added as an associate editor later in 2006, and Oren Katzeff, who became Cracked.com's general manager in November 2007 after running business development for Yahoo Media Group. Cracked.com published two to four articles daily (2,000 – 3,000 words each), along with video content, short-form content, and contests. The feature articles were the most popular, usually pulling in around one million views in their first week.

In 2010, Cracked drew over one billion page views. By 2012, Jack O'Brien reported over 300 million page views in February and 7.3 million unique monthly users, making it the most visited humor site in the world, ahead of The Onion, CollegeHumor, and Funny or Die.

Writer Daniel O'Brien was questioned by the FBI and United States Secret Service after writing an article titled "How to Kidnap the President's Daughter".

In November 2013, the Cracked web site was hacked and was unwittingly delivering malware to site visitors. The hackers injected JavaScript that caused malicious software to be distributed to page viewers.

In 2013, Cracked.com launched "The Cracked Podcast" on the Earwolf podcast network.

On April 12, 2016, Cracked was purchased by the E. W. Scripps Company for $39 million.

In June 2017, Jack O'Brien stepped down from his position as editor-in-chief and left Cracked to build up the new comedy podcasting division at HowStuffWorks. Jack O'Brien chose Alex Schmidt as the new host of "The Cracked Podcast". Schmidt hosted more than 150 episodes, and toured the podcast in the U.S. and to London.

In October 2017, Soren Bowie left Cracked to become a writer on American Dad!, while Michael Swaim left Cracked to pursue other interests.

On December 4, 2017, E. W. Scripps laid off 25 staff members from the website, including Daniel O'Brien, Cody Johnston, and the entire video team, in an effort to cut costs.

On September 10, 2019, Cracked was acquired by Literally Media, home to KnowYourMeme, Cheezburger, and eBaum's World.

Literally Media fired Robert Brockway in February 2020. Afterward, Brockway and fellow longtime Cracked writer Sean "Seanbaby" Reiley then co-founded their own comedy website, 1900HotDog.com. Alex Schmidt was fired by Literally Media in June 2020. Afterward, Schmidt started his own podcast, "Secretly Incredibly Fascinating".

== Features ==
The Cracked "front page" formerly contained columns by a staff of regular contributors, including Sean "Seanbaby" Reiley, Daniel O'Brien, Robert Brockway, Cody Johnston, Soren Bowie, Chris Bucholz, host and writer of the web series Hate by Numbers Wayne Gladstone, John Cheese, Christina Hsu, and Michael Swaim, head writer and performer of the sketch comedy group "Those Aren't Muskets!". It also published videos, weekly image manipulation contests called Photoplasty and Pictofacts, and a daily "Craptions" contest where users added funny captions to odd photographs. The site also hosted Pointless Waste of Time, Pargin's old forum, which contained a writer's workshop, a section for readers to submit content for the Photoplasty and Pictofacts contests, and a template for generating small, one-shot articles called "Quick Fixes," along with general and specific discussion threads on a variety of topics. Eventually the Craptions contest was moved from the front page to the forums.

The Writer's Workshop section of the forum was limited-access (by request only), and it functioned as a "virtual writer's room", where more than 2,500 would-be writers pitched articles to which other users and editors provided feedback. According to former general manager Oren Katzeff, "Nothing gets on the homepage without heavy editing"; [writers] "pitch the site's on-staff editorial team, who give out assignments and feedback to writers after an idea is greenlit". O'Brien and five other editors picked and refined the best material. More than 90% of the stories on the top spot of Cracked's homepage came from the Workshop. Cracked became known for its popular listicles, which include titles like "The 6 Most Insane People To Ever Run For President" and "7 Basic Things You Won't Believe You're All Doing Wrong".

After being sold to Literally Media, the forums were taken down and all reader-generated content was discontinued in favor of Image macro sets created by a few regular inside contributors, due to their suitability for posting on social media. Old articles, columns, and image sets are still hosted on the site (some with broken formatting or missing images) but many of the old videos are only available on the Cracked YouTube channel.

== Video content ==
About 30% of Cracked's content is video. In 2009, Cracked debuted the web series Agents of Cracked, which generated 20 million views over three seasons. In July 2010, Cracked debuted After Hours, a video-debate version of Cracked's lists, which features four Cracked staffers discussing topics such as "Why Batman Is Secretly Terrible for Gotham" and "Why 'Star Wars' Is Secretly Terrifying for Women". In October 2014, Cracked had 22 web series exclusive to their site.

=== Original run of video content (2009–2017) ===
Cracked ran the following video series from 2009 to 2017. In December 2017, Cracked ended its original video productions when E. W. Scripps Company, which purchased the website in 2016, laid off the entire video production and writing staff.

- "Agents of Cracked" – Michael Swaim and Daniel O'Brien portray fictionalized versions of themselves and their bizarre experiences while writing for Cracked. (November 2009 – July 2011)
- "After Hours" – Soren Bowie, Daniel O'Brien, Michael Swaim, and Katie Willert share a meal at a diner (at first, the Village Grille, and later, the Los Feliz Café) and discuss a pop culture issue. (July 2010 – December 2017)
- "Today's Topic" – Two staff members sitting in adjoining office cubicles discuss a pop culture issue. (April 2012 – December 2017)
- "Obsessive Pop Culture Disorder" – Daniel O'Brien, sitting at a desk in a studio, rants about pop culture issues. (August 2012 – December 2017)
- "Hate By Numbers"— Wayne Gladstone lists the reasons why a clip from a news report, music video, movie trailer or viral video is great or terrible.
- "Cracked TV" – Michael Swaim commenting on media trends, pop culture, and viral videos in a list format. The precursor to "Does Not Compute". (October 2008 – April 2010)
- "Does Not Compute" – Michael Swaim shows strange videos found on the internet based on a different theme in each episode. (May 2010 – June 2015)
- "Stuff That Must Have Happened" – Sketches purporting to show the true origin of events. (April 2010 – December 2017)
- "Honest Commercials" – Jack Hunter portrays Roger Horton, a businessman who promotes products of his various companies with brutal honesty. (Original Run: September 2012 – December 2017, Revival: July 2021 – present)
- "Escort Mission" – Two roommates, a hardcore gamer (L33T) and a casual gamer (N00B) discuss modern video games and the unexpected implications of their worlds. (February 2014 – December 2017)
- "New Guy Weekly" – Alex Schmidt, then a newcomer on Cracked, demonstrates his extreme work ineptitude while filming himself on the phone for his video blog. (September 2014 – June 2015)
- "Cracked Responds" – Cracked staff members share their reactions to a recent topic, such as movie trailers or politics. (January 2015 – December 2017)
- "Hilarious Helmet History"—Alex Schmidt corrects your commonly held historical mis-conceptions... but with funny hats! (2016 - 2017)
- "So You Want To Be..."—Alex Schmidt talks about how challenging it would be to be a pop culture hero (Batman, Wolverine, James Bond) in real life. (2017)
- "Some News" – Cody Johnston delivers a recent week's news report, while being increasingly frustrated by some of the news subjects' behavior. (May 2017 – December 2017) Johnston formed the YouTube channel Some More News as a continuation of the show. The show has also continued in podcast form, and now releases extra episodes every Friday which feature a co-host, Katy Stoll.
- "Katie Willert Experience" – A sketch comedy series featuring Katie Willert. (August 2011 – September 2012)
- "The Start-Up" – Michael Swaim, Cody Johnston, and Katy Stoll as three people working from home who meet through teleconference to discuss their new start-up company. (November 2011 – October 2013)
- "Marvels of the Science" – A parody of nature documentary films featuring Cody Johnston as Prof. Scott Bug who is totally clueless about things he is talking about. (August 2012 – March 2014)
- "8-Bits" – Sketches parodying life as depicted in video games. (October 2012 – June 2013)
- "Dispatches from Goddamn Space" – Soren Bowie plays an astronaut (undergoing a criminal investigation) stationed on the International Space Station giving lectures full of misinformation to elementary school students watching from classrooms on Earth's surface. (September 2013 – February 2014)
- "The Spit Take" – Jack O'Brien addresses some theme, usually illustrated with video clips. (November 2013 – April 2017)
- "Adventures in Jedi School" – A Star Wars parody focused on the Jedi. (January 2014)
- "Rom.Com" – Employees of an online dating website company deal with various workplace situations. (March 2014 – March 2016)
- "Welcome Back Potter" – A parody of the Harry Potter franchise. (April 2014 – May 2014)
- "Antiheroes" – A parody of a superhero origin story. (August 2014)
- "Starship Icarus" – A parody of Star Trek from the viewpoint of the lower-deck crew. (October 2014)
- "The Stumbling Dead" – A parody of the television series The Walking Dead from the zombies point of view. (October 2015)
- "We're Not Alone" – A parody of science fiction movies about the first contact with alien life. (May 2016 – June 2016)
- "Galactic War Room" – Another Star Wars parody, this time focused on the Rebel Alliance. (November 2016)
- "After the Trump" – Daniel O'Brien, Cody Johnston and Katy Stoll discuss the ongoing Donald Trump presidency as if it was a scripted television drama, with spoilers, theories and predictions. (February 2017 – March 2017)
- Live episodes of "The Cracked Podcast", hosted by Jack O'Brien and then by Alex Schmidt.

=== Revival of video content (2020–present) ===
In April 2020, new video content was being produced once again for Cracked by Dr. Jordan Breeding. The following are the new series created since Cracked's video content was revived:

- Quorators - A podcast where hosts Alex Ptak and Jeremy Kaplowitz ask: "What is Quora?" (Aug 2023 - Jan 2024)
  - The podcast was cancelled after Kaplowitz claims the stream "made no money for them" and he was too loud while working on content in an office with a door that did not properly close.
- New episodes of "Honest Ads" with actor Jack Hunter.
- Your Brain On Cracked – Jordan Breeding, sitting at a desk in a studio, rants about pop culture issues.
- Movies For $20: Hollywood blockbuster films and prestige television shows are recreated on a budget of $20.
- Wait a Minute ... What?': Melissa Aquiles digs into childhood pop culture items to show us how the recent past was quite a bit stranger than you remembered.
- CanonBall: Jesse Eisemann digs up pieces of the more obscure aspects of a franchise's canon. (2021–present)
- Cracked Fiend – former Cracked writer Karl Smallwood returns in a series similar to his Fact Fiend channel, only this time he reads articles what other people have written – Co-Hosted by Jordan Breeding. (May 2021 – June 2021)

== Cheat Sheets ==
In 2011, Cracked partnered with Rotten Tomatoes and Movieclips to launch Cheat Sheets, a comedic, user-generated guide to popular movies. For example, Ratatouille's description reads "Remy the rat is obsessed with good food, and he has learned to cook by watching television in the same way that Jackie Chan fans have all become Kung-Fu masters. Remy stumbles upon an unsuspecting janitor working in a Parisian restaurant and figures out how to tap into his central nervous system, controlling his every movement".

== Books ==
Cracked.com released its first book, You Might Be a Zombie and Other Bad News, in 2010. Published by the Penguin Group's Plume division, the book features 20 articles that had previously appeared on the website, and 18 that are new to the book. The book is formatted as a comedy trivia book, and includes chapters like 'The Four Most Badass Presidents of All Time' and 'The Awful Truth Behind Five Items on Your Grocery List'.

It reached #9 on The New York Times secondary "Paperback Advice & Misc." best sellers list, and sold more than 40,000 copies. As part of the marketing campaign, Cracked encouraged fans to post pictures of themselves alongside the book with 50-word captions.

Crown Publishing Group acquired the rights to Cracked writer Daniel O'Brien's How to Fight Presidents, for more than $60,000. The book is a comedic look at the secret to fighting and defeating every U.S. President in history.

Cracked.com released its second book, The De-Textbook: The Stuff You Didn't Know About the Stuff You Thought You Knew, on October 29, 2013.

== Live shows ==
Cracked has also expanded into live shows. At the 2011 SXSW festival, Cracked hosted Cracked Live, which featured live performances from Michael Swaim, Soren Bowie, Daniel O'Brien, Katie Willert, and Cody Johnston. In November 2011, Cracked hosted three panels at Comikaze Expo, a multi-media, popular culture convention. They hosted "The Making of 'After Hours': How a Conversation Becomes an Episode", "Comedy Troupes Are the New Rock Stars", and a performance of the sketch comedy showcase "Cracked LIVE: The 6 Most Bafflingly Hilarious Things Happening in Front of You (Right Now)!".

== Reception ==
In 2011, Wired magazine called Cracked "addictive", "hauntingly funny" and "terrifyingly well-informed". Mother Jones in 2013 called Cracked.com "one of the hottest humor sites on the web" and said its content includes "some of the most uproarious and sage commentary on the interwebs", describing it as "striking the right balance of pop culture, bawdy humor, and intellect". In one month, Cracked users spent over 255 million minutes on the site, which is 5 times more than Comedy Central's site and 9 times more than Funny or Die.

In 2010, the web series Agents of Cracked, featuring Daniel O'Brien and Michael Swaim, won the Audience Choice Award at the second annual Streamy Awards. In 2012, Cracked received a People's Choice Webby Award for Best Humor Website.

In 2013 Cracked was accused of disseminating factually incorrect information by Vice.com, specifically in their "5 Depressing Realities Behind Popular Reality TV Shows" article.

Due to ownership and staffing changes that occurred mainly beginning in 2016 when the website was purchased by the E. W. Scripps Company, and again in 2019 when it was purchased by Literally Media, public reception of the quality of content and articles offered by Cracked.com has dwindled. One noteworthy example of criticism came from Ashley Mangtani, as he wrote in his October 24, 2021 piece on Medium, titled "The Downfall Of Cracked.com & The Cancellation Of The Once Famous Cracked Podcast." Mangtani concluded that: "The bottom line is simple, Cracked were bought by a company that wanted nothing more than to break into the digital media market. But they knew nothing about the nuances of managing a creative media stream and vainly tried to cut costs wherever they could. This resulted in all of the best people at Cracked being fired until the company self-destructed into oblivion and stopped creating great content."

As of January 2023, their YouTube channel has 1.0 billion views and 2.76 million subscribers.

== Featured writers and editors ==
Current

- Tamara Castro
- Elena Childers
- Etai Eshet
- Keegan Kelly
- Belen Leiva
- Bar Mor Hazut
- Jay Wells L'Ecuyer

Former

- Carmen Angelica
- Tara Ariano
- David Christopher Bell
- Kathy Benjamin
- Zanandi Botes
- Soren Bowie
- Jordan Breeding
- Robert Brockway
- Liddy Bugg
- Adam Tod Brown
- Chris Bucholz
- Isaac Cabe
- C. Coville
- Daniel Dockery
- Robert Evans
- Ivan Farkas
- Ian Fortey
- Ian Garner
- Wayne Gladstone ("Gladstone")
- Katie Goldin
- Mark Hill
- Kristi Harrison
- Christina Hsu ("Christina H.")
- Jason Iannone
- Xavier Jackson
- Cyriaque Lamar
- Mack Leighty ("John Cheese")
- Amanda Mannen
- Brendan McGinley
- Luke McKinney
- JM McNab
- Ryan Menezes
- Brittany Mignanelli
- Daniel O'Brien
- Jack O'Brien (former Editor-In-Chief)
- Pauli Poisuo
- Luis Prada
- Jacopo della Quercia
- Sean Patrick Reiley ("Seanbaby")
- Marina Reimann
- Tom Reimann
- Winston Rowntree
- J.F. Sargent
- Alex Schmidt
- Karl Smallwood
- Ann Smiley
- Matt Solomon
- Katy Stoll
- Kelly Stone
- Cezary Jan Strusiewicz
- Tiago Manuel
- Michael Swaim
- Evan V. Symon
- Carly Tennes
- Logan Trent
- Cedric Voets
- Adam Wears
- Jonathan Wojcik
- Jason Pargin ("David Wong")
- Ross Wolinsky
- Eric Yosomono
- Eli Yudin

== See also ==
- Cheezburger
- Know Your Meme
- Den of Geek
- Fail Blog
- List of satirical news websites
- List of Internet phenomena
