= Howard Love =

American businessman

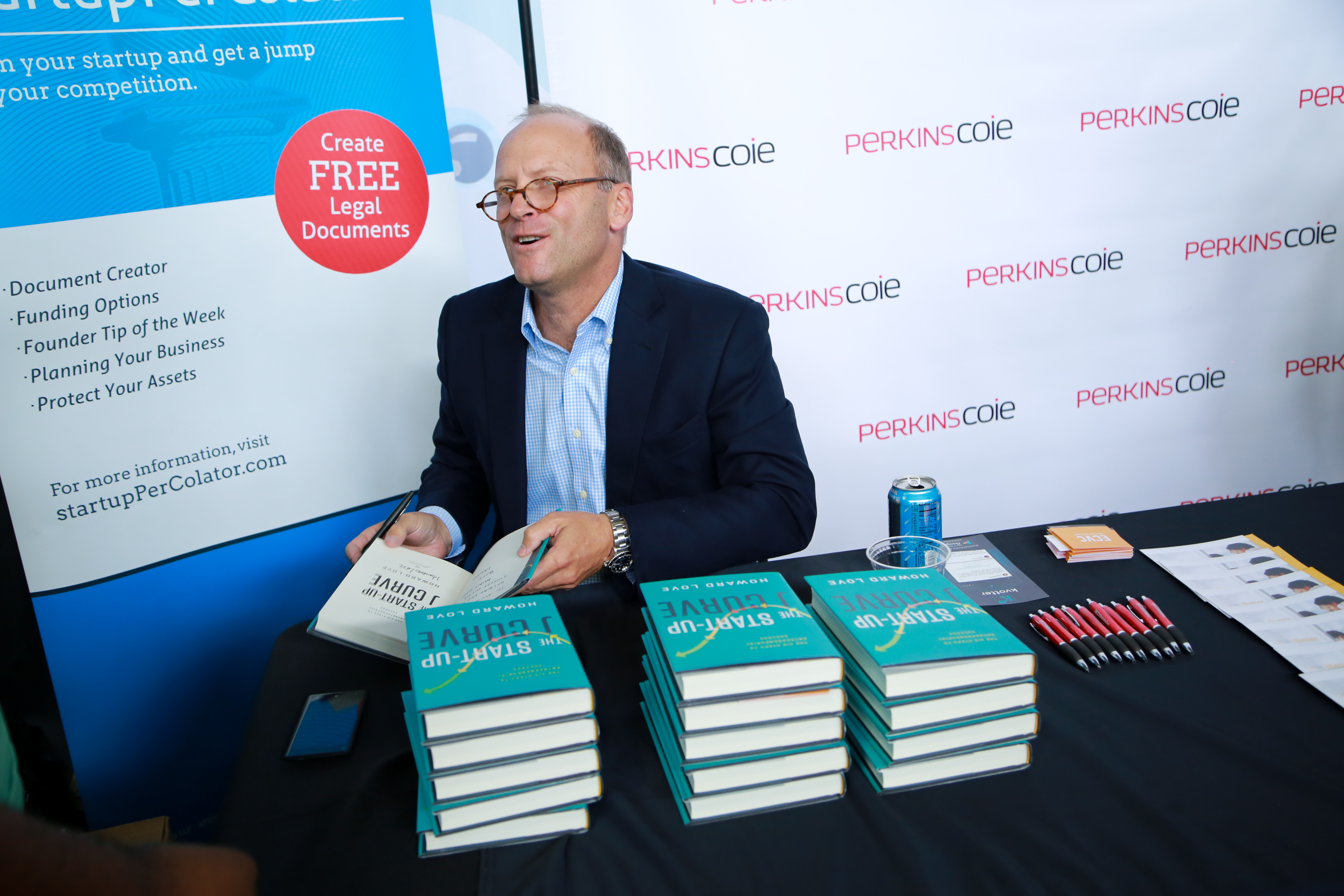
- Love at the TechCrunch Disrupt SF in 2016
- Born: Howard Love
- Occupation(s): Entrepreneur, investor, author

Howard Love (born June 9, 1960) is an American executive, author and entrepreneur. Love is the former CEO of LoveToKnow Media, a digital publishing group.

== Early life ==
Love was born in Detroit in 1960. He is the grandson of WWI flying ace George Augustus Vaughn Jr. and US industrialist George H. Love. His father, Howard M. "Pete" Love, was the CEO and chairman of National Steel and served on the boards of TWA and Monsanto. He attended Phillips Exeter Academy (1974–1978) and Colgate University (1978–1983).

== Career ==
Love is an angel investor who has been an entrepreneur since the 1980s, and has founded or co-founded over 15 companies.

His first business book, The Start-Up J Curve (Greenleaf Book Group) was published in 2016.

== Personal life ==
Love currently resides in the United States.
