= Michael Swaim =

American actor

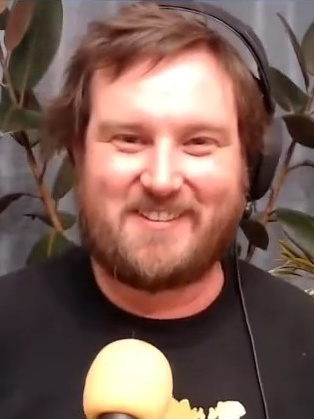
- Swaim in 2021
- Born: June 7, 1985 (age 41)
- Education: University of California, San Diego
- Occupations: Actor, comedian, filmmaker, humorist, podcaster, writer
- Years active: 2006-present
- Known for: Those Aren't Muskets, Cracked.com, Small Beans, IGN
- Notable work: After Hours, Agents of Cracked, Kill Me Now, The Climb

Michael Swaim (born June 7, 1985) is an American actor, comedian, filmmaker, podcaster, and writer. While attending the University of California, San Diego, he became a columnist for the humor website Cracked.com, and after graduating in 2007, he joined with Abe Epperson to co-found the internet sketch comedy troupe Those Aren't Muskets. Along with Epperson and another frequent collaborator, Daniel O'Brien, he spent the late 2000s establishing a video department for Cracked. His subsequent tenure as Head of Video for the website produced several viral web series that he and O'Brien often starred in; these include the Webby Award-winning After Hours and the Streamy Award-winning Agents of Cracked.

The 2010 independent horror-comedy film Kill Me Now was co-written by Swaim and features him in a starring role. Swaim and Epperson are currently in production on their second feature film, Papa Bear. Two audio collections of short stories and poems by Swaim have been released, and in 2023, Swaim self-published a novel, The Climb. In 2024, he self-published a comic book, One Last Job.

Through his affiliation with Cracked, Swaim contributed to the 2010 New York Times Best Seller You Might Be a Zombie and Other Bad News. He then served as a Senior Editor on a 2013 followup, The De-textbook. Until his departure from Cracked in October 2017, Swaim was a regular feature on podcasts produced by the website. At that time, he co-hosted the series Kurt Vonneguys with Alex Schmidt.

Currently, Swaim runs Small Beans, an online comedy network funded through Patreon. Small Beans was founded by Swaim and Epperson together in December 2017; the two were joined from the outset by a co-worker they had befriended at Cracked, Adam Ganser, and numerous Cracked alumni have since come to be involved in content produced by Small Beans. In October 2019, Swaim began producing video content for IGN while continuing to operate Small Beans. From 2022 through 2023, iHeartMedia distributed Swaim and Ganser's gaming-themed podcast series 1Upsmanship. The A.V. Club, Collider, The Nation, and Paste have all named Swaim's work at Small Beans as among the best in podcasting.

== Early life ==
Michael Swaim was born on June 7, 1985 and grew up in San Diego County, California. His parents divorced when he was seven. Swaim's uncle is folk singer and Waterbug Records founder Andrew Calhoun.

At age nine, Swaim and his younger brother, David, survived a car accident that occurred on Thanksgiving Day. Swaim sustained a brain injury from the crash and subsequently suffered from panic attacks as a child. Soon after the crash, he developed depression, which has reoccurred throughout his life.

Swaim attended a Montessori school for sixth grade and Standley Middle School for seventh grade. His family then moved to Ramona, California, where he finished his schooling.

In a 2011 interview with The Huffington Post, Swaim explained his artistic influences saying, "I'm sure The Simpsons is a big part of it, and I'd like to think there's some Vonnegut and even a little Shakespeare in there. Shakespeare for his appreciation of a good pun and his cavalier abuse of the language he so clearly loved, Vonnegut for his eye for truth and his brevity. I doubt anyone will see any of that in my writing, but I try, dammit."

== Career ==
=== Those Aren't Muskets and early writings ===
Swaim attended the University of California, San Diego, where he majored in theatre with a minor in creative writing. Before beginning his career in comedy, he contributed short stories to science fiction magazines. He also aspired to become a playwright. While attending UCSD, he served as an editor of the university's satirical publication, the Muir Quarterly, commonly known as "the MQ". In 2006, he began writing comedy articles on a freelance basis for Cracked.com. The website gave him a blog, called "The Specious", and during Swaim's senior year of college, he became a columnist for Cracked. Around this time, he also contributed articles to McSweeney's and Yankee Pot Roast. In September 2007, "The Specious" ceased publication. Swaim's columns for Cracked were later published as part of a separate blog called "S.W.A.I.M.".

Fellow MQ editor Abe Epperson befriended Swaim when they were both UCSD sophomores, and the two have remained frequent collaborators throughout their careers. Together, shortly after graduating in 2007, they founded the internet sketch comedy troupe Those Aren't Muskets. Swaim continued during this time to be involved with UCSD's theatre program, producing his own original comedy play, Olympus Inc, from which cast members occasionally crossed over into Those Aren't Muskets videos. Within months, the troupe's content had attained over 100,000 views. Videos produced by the troupe were posted to websites like YouTube, Revver, Cracked, CollegeHumor, and Funny or Die, in addition to the now-defunct thosearentmuskets.com.

Towards the end of 2007, Those Aren't Muskets began a partnership with Cracked. The first video produced through this collaboration, "Internet Party", found success on Digg and was featured on YouTube's homepage. The video quickly surpassed two million views. Gaining media attention, it was identified by The San Diego Union-Tribune as Swaim and Epperson's "first bona fide hit". Years later, Cracked video producer Breandan Carter identified "Internet Party" as the "breakthrough video" that "put [Cracked.com] on the map as observational humorists."

According to Swaim, a "symbiosis" quickly developed between Those Aren't Muskets and Cracked, and from this came the web series Cracked TV - initially announced under the title S.W.A.I.M. and later rebranded as Does Not Compute. By 2008, Those Aren't Muskets had grown to an official membership of six. Non-members were often cast in the troupe's videos as well, and among them was Katie Willert, a then-UCSD student, who, later in her career, would co-star alongside Swaim in numerous Cracked video productions. In 2008, Swaim's brother, David, guest-starred in "Chops", a Those Aren't Muskets video which placed fourth - over hundreds of submissions - in YouTube's Sketchies II competition. That same year, Those Aren't Muskets was featured during the "Kings of Dot Comedy" segment on G4's series Attack of the Show. Over the summer of 2008, Swaim and Epperson moved to Los Angeles together.

=== Cracked tenure and Kill Me Now ===
When Cracked decided to start producing its own video content, Swaim was enlisted to lead the effort. He and Epperson teamed up with Daniel O'Brien to create the first official Cracked web series, Agents of Cracked. The series began airing in November 2009 and ran for three seasons. Its first season won the "Audience choice award for best web series" at the Second Annual Streamy Awards. By 2011, the series had been viewed online over seven million times.

Those Aren't Muskets remained active for a few more years, producing the web series 8-Bits for Cracked, and joining in 2009 with several other internet sketch troupes for a two-week collaboration known as Genius Camp. One of the sketches resulting from this collaboration was featured on Comedy Central's series Tosh.0. Swaim had a cameo role that year in the BriTANicK video "Epic Phone Fail". He had a cameo role a year later in the MagicHugs video "Cover Me".

By 2010, Swaim had become Head of Video at Cracked. He continued starring in original video series produced by the website, among them After Hours, which won Best Writing at the 18th Annual Webby Awards. According to The Huffington Post, Swaim and his frequent co-star, O'Brien, came to be known as the collective "face of Cracked".

As Swaim became more involved with video production for Cracked, he wrote fewer columns for the website but took on supplementary work as a blogger for guyspeak.com. Swaim's work for GuySpeak was occasionally featured in Glamour. Offering humor-based relationship advice, Swaim contributed to GuySpeak for about a year, starting in late 2009.

In 2010, Swaim told The Huffington Post that he hoped his tenure at Cracked would be a step towards eventually making feature films. Later that year, Swaim and Epperson were contacted by filmmaker Travis Long, who expressed interest in working with the duo on a feature. Swaim and Epperson had already developed a story idea together, and with Long's help, this idea was turned into the horror-comedy film Kill Me Now. Swaim, who had a starring role in the film, wrote the screenplay and received a producer credit, while Long directed, and Epperson performed the cinematography. Kill Me Now was produced through Ketchup Media. It was shot in Effingham, Illinois. Filming occurred in October 2010 and lasted for twenty-one days.

Although Swaim was initially unsure about acting in Kill Me Now, he took a starring role due to the film's short production schedule. The film's cast and crew included several internet sketch comedians, among them, Beck Bennett and Kyle Mooney, who would both go on to join Saturday Night Live shortly after appearing in the film. Kill Me Now premiered in Los Angeles on December 5, 2012. It then had a limited theatrical release through Tugg, a service that allows people to bring screenings of films to their local city when enough tickets are pre-ordered. (Note: Swaim later acted in Long's second feature film, B-Roll, which entered production in 2014 and premiered in 2016. Long tweeted in 2017 that the film was still looking for a distributor.)

Swaim contributed to Cracked's 2010 New York Times Best Seller, You Might Be a Zombie and Other Bad News, and served as a Senior Editor on Cracked's 2013 release, The De-textbook. Throughout his tenure at Cracked, he often appeared on - and occasionally co-hosted - the Cracked podcast. He also co-hosted the Cracked-produced podcast Kurt Vonneguys with Alex Schmidt. Kurt Vonneguys was hailed by The A.V. Club as "a must, both for those deeply familiar with Vonnegut’s work and those seeking an entry point."

After the release of Kill Me Now, Swaim hoped to quickly continue on to more feature films and grew dissatisfied with his position at Cracked, once it became apparent to him that the company's corporate owners were unwilling to fund any large-scale projects. A lack of creative fulfillment eventually prompted Swaim to relinquish his role as the head of Cracked's video department. Swaim later recounted that his depression, which he had suffered from since childhood, gradually worsened during this stage of his life, and over time, he continued to reduce his role at Cracked. He resigned from the company in October 2017. A few weeks later, Cracked laid off much of its remaining staff. Speaking to the company's struggles, Swaim expressed his view that Cracked had squandered its "potential to become an SNL or a National Lampoon-type brand with feature films and so forth." Nonetheless, Swaim has spoken highly of the work that has been continued on by Cracked's current employees.

=== Small Beans ===
After Swaim's departure from Cracked, he and Epperson founded a new venture together, called Small Beans. Funded through Patreon, Small Beans is a podcasting network that also produces occasional sketch comedy videos. Swaim and Epperson were joined in the founding of Small Beans by Adam Ganser, who like Epperson, was a prolific director of videos at Cracked. Several other former members of Cracked have since come to join Small Beans or have contributed to Small Beans content.

Small Beans was first announced by Swaim on December 4, 2017. The following day, Swaim posted a video online, explaining his decision to resign from Cracked and offering further details about Small Beans. The formal launch date for Small Beans was on December 11, although the first Small Beans content debuted a week in advance.

Small Beans launched with four podcast series: Frame Rate, a movie review series hosted by Swaim and Epperson; 1Upsmanship, a video game review series hosted by Swaim and Ganser; Extree! Extree!, a news-themed series that provides both Small Beans-related updates and comedic takes on current events; and Tales from the Pit, in which Swaim is joined by a guest each episode to discuss experiences with depression and other emotionally challenging issues.

As Small Beans has grown, more podcast series have been added. Additional content released through Small Beans includes Q&A podcast episodes, original rap songs written and performed by Swaim, access to various writings by Swaim (including screenplays and pitches for cancelled projects), behind-the-scenes livestreams, and Twitch streams.

Small Beans collaborates with Showing Up for Racial Justice on the podcast Bold (sometimes referred to as Bold: Conversations About Race), which focuses on racial justice issues and is produced by White People 4 Black Lives. In December 2020, Small Beans began co-producing the podcast series Bewilderments & Scientifics with the Some More News media network. The following year, Small Beans began collaborating with the Gamefully Unemployed media network on two different podcast series: Star Trek: The Next Futurama, which began airing in April 2021, and Spielboys!, which began airing in October of that year.

On March 7, 2020, Small Beans released a sketch comedy radio play titled Bean Town, which was written by Swaim, Epperson, and Greg Burke. A sequel, Bean Town II, was released on August 6, 2021. Swaim and Epperson both returned to write the script for Bean Town II. They also performed as voice actors in both installments of the series, as did Maggie Mae Fish, Cody Johnston, and Katie Willert. The first installment of Bean Town features additional voice acting from Burke, Tyler Brown, Noah Byrne, and Kelsey Hudgins, while Bean Town II features additional voice acting from David Christopher Bell, Adam Tod Brown, Adam Ganser, Sarah Griffith, Nick Kocher, Mark Little, Jeff May, Jacquis Neal, Teresa Lee, and Tom Reimann.

Both recurring video series and stand-alone videos have been produced by Small Beans. In February 2018, Small Beans premiered its first video series, LifeHax; each episode is a zero-budget improvised spoof of do-it-yourself YouTube tutorials. LifeHax was followed in April of that year by the more expensive and high-concept video series Disney Owns You, a sketch comedy series about corporate takeovers conducted by the Walt Disney Company. Another low-budget series, Family Meeting, followed in August; it stars former-Cracked members Cody Johnston and Katy Stoll, alongside Swaim, as siblings who reconnect over webcam.

In April 2019, Small Beans announced the web series, Off Hours, a spiritual successor to After Hours. (Note: Swaim had considered a continuation of After Hours in some form since the beginnings of Small Beans and decided to follow through on the idea after discussing it with Ganser and Greg Burke on a March 2019 episode of the Small Beans Q&A podcast.) To write Off Hours, Swaim, Epperson, and Ganser were joined by David Christopher Bell and Tom Reimann; the group of five had all been writers on After Hours. Swaim edited and Epperson directed each episode of Off Hours, reoccupying roles that they had respectively filled on After Hours. Veteran After Hours artists Anthony Clark and Starline Hodge were hired to contribute illustrations for Off Hours, as were Michael Vincent Bramley and Ben Shannon. Swaim is the only After Hours star to return as a main cast member in Off Hours. He is joined in each episode of Off Hours by a rotating series of guest stars. Cast members announced for Off Hours were Johnston, Stoll, Greg Burke, Maggie Mae Fish, Daniel Vincent Gordh, Teresa Lee, and Damian Washington. Off Hours premiered on June 3, 2019. It was placed on an indefinite hiatus in October 2019 when Swaim moved to San Francisco to begin a job with IGN.

In January 2020, Small Beans premiered a video essay series on film criticism by Epperson called Small Beautiful Things. On October 10, 2023, Small Beans premiered a comedic film trailer recap video series hosted by Swaim, called Last Week's Trailers.

Small Beans has attracted positive attention from several publications. In 2019, The A.V. Club, wrote that 1Upsmanship features "undeniable chemistry" between Swaim, Ganser, and their guests. The A.V. Club later named Small Beans one of the best podcasting networks of 2019, singling out Small Beans for having "the most variety on a single feed" and writing, "What’s as impressive as the amount of podcasts Small Beans pumps out is the quality it maintains: each is insightful, fun, hilarious, and a breeze to listen to." Two years later, Paste named 1Upsmanship one of the best gaming-themed podcasts of 2021. In 2022, Collider named Small Beans one of the best producers of pop-culture podcasts, praising Swaim's work for blending "silly quips and often childish humor" with "surprisingly profound introspection." In 2024, American Prestige, a culture podcast by The Nation, called 1Upsmanship "the best video game podcast today".

==== List of Small Beans podcast series ====
Title	Host(s)	Premiere date	Description	References
Frame Rate	Abe Epperson, Michael Swaim	December 4, 2017	A film review podcast	
Extree! Extree!	Swaim	December 12, 2017	Each episode opens with Swaim updating the audience on developments related to Small Beans; Swaim then transitions into reading comedic news headlines in character as a turn of the century newsboy named Jonny Papes	
Tales from the Pit	Swaim	December 14, 2017	An exploration of depression and other emotionally challenging subjects; Swaim opens most episodes with a short piece of original writing.	
1Upsmanship	Adam Ganser, Swaim	December 18, 2017	A video game review podcast (was distributed through iHeartMedia from 2022 through 2023)	
Pop Culture Petri Dish	Epperson, Cristian Ramirez	March 7, 2018	An exploration of the real ideas behind popular works of science fiction	
Rough Stuff	Bridgett Greenberg, Sarah Griffith	March 11, 2018	Greenberg, Griffith, and their guests regale each other with awkward stories of their youth	
The Coen Brothers Brothers	Epperson, Swaim	May 24, 2018	An exploration of the entire Coen brothers filmography	
My Top 8	Maggie Mae Fish	July 30, 2018	Guests are interviewed by Fish about their most meaningful friendships	
What Dinosaur Real Good?	Epperson, Greenberg, Swaim	November 29, 2018	After conducting their own amateur research on dinosaurs and other prehistoric animals, Epperson, Greenberg, and Swaim share their findings and compare favorite species	
Bold	Season 1: Dahlia Ferlito, Swaim; Season 2: Ivette Alé, Ferlito	December 17, 2018	An exploration of racial justice issues (Small Beans collaborates on this podcast with Showing Up for Racial Justice; the podcast is produced by White People 4 Black Lives)	
Waveformed	Ramirez	July 1, 2019	Guests are interviewed by Ramirez about the music that has most impacted them	
Directorpiece Theatre	Epperson, Ganser	December 3, 2019	Using their perspective as directors, Epperson and Ganser analyze cinema that they consider to be popular but artistically overlooked	
Bean Town	N/A	March 7, 2020	A series of sketch comedy radio plays set in the fictitious Bean Town	
Kings of King	Epperson, Swaim	March 11, 2020	A film review podcast that focuses on adaptations of Stephen King's bibliography	
The Cast and the Curious	Greenberg, Griffith	March 13, 2020	Greenberg, a Fast & Furious-devotee, introduces the franchise to Griffth	
I'll Show You Mine If You Show Me Yours	Fish, Ganser	April 10, 2020	Fish and Ganser learn new details about each other by responding to a shared prompt in each episode	
Science or Whatever	Griffin Rowell, Swaim	August 10, 2020	Swaim interviews his childhood best friend, professional scientist Griffin Rowell	
Bewilderments and Scientifics	Epperson, Cody Johnston	December 15, 2020	An improv comedy podcast, in which Epperson conducts absurdist interviews with the fictional Professor Scott Bugg (voiced by Johnston) about scientific concepts (co-produced with the Some More News media network)	
Movie Production Diary	Epperson, Swaim	January 6, 2021	Behind-the-scenes conversations about the development of Papa Bear	
Star Trek: The Next Futurama	David Christopher Bell, Swaim	April 2, 2021	An exploration of Futurama and Star Trek: The Next Generation (co-produced with the Gamefully Unemployed media network)	
Shooting Threes	Greenberg, Griffith	June 14, 2021	Greenberg and Griffith discuss various film trilogies	
Ander's Sons	Epperson, Swaim	October 1, 2021	An exploration of the entire filmographies of both Paul Thomas Anderson and Wes Anderson	
Spielboys!	Epperson, Reimann	October 19, 2021	An exploration of the entire filmography of Steven Spielberg (co-produced with the Gamefully Unemployed media network)	
Like Razorblade Pie	Swaim	March 18, 2022	An exploration of Harlan Ellison's short stories	
Escape from the Multicurse	Epperson, Ganser, Swaim	July 1, 2022	An exploration of various narrative works dealing with the concept of the multiverse.	
Inside Dads	Bell, Epperson	February 27, 2023	An exploration of what Bell and Epperson classify as "dad movies"	

=== IGN, iHeartMedia, and additional projects ===
A few months after launching Small Beans, Swaim began a relationship with BunnyEars.com, a humor website founded by Macaulay Culkin. Swaim has appeared on the Bunny Ears podcast and has occasionally written articles for the website. Culkin has been featured as a guest on the Small Beans podcast series Frame Rate. As further side-work while operating Small Beans, Swaim wrote for a 2019 installment of The Game Theorists and teamed with Winston Rowntree in December 2021 to create a new video for Cracked, which Swaim described as a "one-off" project. In 2023, Swaim became a columnist for the comedy website 1-900-HOTDOG, began writing for the webseries Some More News, and began performing voice-over work for Weird History.

In October 2019, Swaim moved to San Francisco for a position at IGN, serving as Manager of Video Programming until 2022. He filled this role while continuing to operate Small Beans. Through his involvement with IGN, he acted as a host at Gamescom in both 2020 and 2021. In early 2022, he left his position at IGN for what he described as "a narrative design role" with a video game "dev team that's brand new and has not announced themselves." He described the game as multiplayer "by definition" and "based on a novel".

On January 12, 2021, Swaim self-released NOSIDE, an audio collection of his own original short stories and poems. A follow-up, Sad & Important, was self-released by Swaim on January 2, 2022. Both collections feature original scores by Davey Francis. In 2023, two short stories by Swaim, "The Chosen One" and "Run || Time", were published in the science fiction and fantasy anthology Impossible Worlds.

In May 2022, 1Upsmanship ended its run on the Small Beans network so that it could become a part of iHeartMedia. The first episode of 1Upsmanship to be distributed by iHeartMedia premiered on June 6, 2022. After one season at iHeartMedia, 1Upsmanship returned to Small Beans.

The 2021 video game, Carve Snowboarding (released for the Oculus Quest 2), and its 2023 sequel, Carve Jr (released for Playdate), feature vocal performances by Swaim in the role of Carv Edgerton. The character's likeness is based on Swaim.

In August 2023, Swaim announced plans to release his first novel, The Climb, and his first album, Tools of the Tirade. A month later, he announced plans to publish his first comic book, One Last Job. The Climb was self-published and released digitally through the Small Beans Patreon shop on November 27, 2023. Physical copies were released on March 18, 2024. Swaim described the book as "a psychedelic magical realist sci-fi/fantasy epic self-help memoir." Elaborating on his description of the book, he said, "It talks frankly about my alcoholism, mental health struggles, and time at Cracked, but...there's also magic and robots." One Last Job was self-released digitally through the Small Beans Patreon shop on February 16, 2024, and is illustrated by Garth von Ahnen. Tools of the Tirade, a rap album, was self-released on November 20, 2024. An album of early raps by Swaim, Less Good Than Ezra, was also self-released at that time.

Throughout his time operating Small Beans, Swaim set a long-term goal of producing a short or feature film. In 2023, Swaim and Epperson successfully raised money through crowdfunding to begin production on a feature film, Papa Bear.

In November 2024, Swaim resumed creating video content for Cracked.

== Personal life ==
Swaim came out as queer in 2021, saying, "I'm in a monogamous relationship with a partner the world sees as female, but am sexually attracted to all sorts of folks. I never faced any special challenges as a result, which is why I've never felt 'Queer enough' to consider myself part of what I consider a special community. But after talking with friends, I've learned that 'not feeling Queer enough' and being afraid of appropriating that identity is common among Queer people, and not a reason to hide behind the myth of straightness."

Swaim married his partner on May 28, 2023. His partner is nonbinary.

== See also ==
- Daniel O'Brien
- Jason Pargin
- Seanbaby
- Jamie Loftus
