= Pluck (company) =

American Internet company

Pluck was an American Internet company based in Austin, Texas, that ran a website since 2005 that offered an RSS reader. The company was acquired by Demand Media on March 3, 2008 for US$75 million in cash.
