= Kittenpants =

American online humor magazine

- Categories: Online humor magazine
- Frequency: Monthly
- Founder: Darci Ratliff
- Founded: 2000
- Final issue: 2007
- Company: Kittenpants.com
- Country: United States
- Website: www.kittenpants.com

Kittenpants was an online humor magazine published monthly from 2000 to 2007 on Kittenpants.com.

== History and profile ==
Kittenpants was founded in 2000 by Darci Ratliff, who also wrote under the name Kittenpants for other publications, including the Comedy Central Insider. Her style was described by the Seattle Post-Intelligencer as "a mix of ridicule of others and self-deprecation."

The magazine featured the work of writers who have since gone on to work for Comedy Central, McSweeney's, Late Night with Jimmy Fallon, and The Onion's AV Club. It also featured the early short films of Tim Heidecker and Eric Wareheim of Tim and Eric Awesome Show, Great Job!. Each issue of Kittenpants featured an interview with an actor, comedian, musician or filmmaker, including David Cross, Devo, Bruce Campbell, and several members of MTV's The State.

In 2003, the Kittenpants CD, Kitty Kitty Bang Bang, was released on Seattle's Guns A Blazin' record label. It featured bands from Denton, Texas, including the Riverboat Gamblers and Centro-matic. The same year also marked the beginning of Kittenpants Productions, as Ratliff began work as a producer for independent films.

In 2007, Ratliff published If I Did It: The Kittenpants Anthology, a collection of articles and interviews from the magazine.

== Selected former staff ==
- Corn Mo
- Mark Hedman of Centro-Matic
- Tim Heidecker
- Will Johnson
- Darci Ratliff
- Eric Wareheim

== Selected interviews ==
- Todd Barry
- H. Jon Benjamin
- Michael Ian Black
- Joe Bob Briggs
- Bruce Campbell
- Gerald Casale of DEVO
- Centro-Matic
- David Cross
- Eddie Deezen
- Tim DeLaughter
- John Flansburgh of They Might Be Giants
- Keith Gordon
- Gary Gygax
- Calvin Johnson
- Jordan Knight
- Pat Mastroianni
- Eugene Mirman
- Brian Posehn
- Andy Richter
- Dan Savage
- Michael Showalter
- David Wain
- Dave Willis and Matt Maiellaro, creators of Aqua Teen Hunger Force
