= Robert Evans (journalist) =

American journalist, author and podcast host

- Born: March 22, 1988 (age 38)
- Occupations: Journalist, author, podcast host
- Employer(s): Cool Zone Media (2021–) iHeartMedia (2018–); Bellingcat; Cracked (2009–2017)

Robert Madison Evans (born March 22, 1988) is an American internet broadcaster, journalist, and author who has reported on global conflicts and online extremism. A former editor at the humor website Cracked.com, Evans has also written for the investigative journalism outlet Bellingcat while working on several podcasts, including Behind the Bastards, Behind the Police, Behind the Insurrections, It Could Happen Here, The Women's War, and Worst Year Ever. In 2021 he published his first novel, After the Revolution (AK Press 2022) first as a serialized podcast.

== Early life ==
Evans was born on March 22, 1988, and grew up in Idabel, Oklahoma and Plano, Texas, graduating from Plano East Senior High School in 2006. While attending college he began to distance himself from his parents' beliefs. His parents tried to open several small businesses and admired Ronald Reagan and Pat Buchanan.

== Career ==
=== Early career ===
Evans worked at the humor website Cracked as an editorial manager. In that position, Evans led a team that published "personal experience" articles. These articles fell into two main categories: journalistic pieces involving a variety of sources and personal narratives. In 2016 Evans published his first book, A Brief History of Vice, about the formative effects of narcotics on the development and history of civilization.

=== Journalism ===
Evans has done reporting for the investigative reporting outlet Bellingcat between 2018 and 2021. In 2020, he has reported on conflicts in Iraq, Ukraine, and Rojava, as well as on far-right extremists in the United States. In the wake of the 2019 Poway synagogue shooting, Vox relied on Evans' work to explain how the shooter's manifesto again constituted a 74-page in-joke meant to further radicalize other 4chan /pol/ users. In a 2020 article, Evans discussed the emergence and qualities of the boogaloo movement, a loose-knit group of individuals who express interest in fomenting American civil unrest. Evans says that he became aware of the boogaloo movement when he observed members at 2020 Virginia Citizens Defence League Lobby Day. In his view, the 1950s mass UFO belief was the first "populist anti-government movement".

In the late 2010s and early 2020s, Evans produced a variety of content about 8chan, an anonymous message board, as well as the Gamergate controversy movement, a movement he describes as largely organically generated, with some direction given by white supremacists and extremists with long experience in radicalizing people on internet forums. After covering the Christchurch mosque shootings, one 8chan user posted an offering of what amounted to $60,000 for Evans' death, while users overall argued it was simply a joke. Following the March 2019 attack, news outlets including Rolling Stone, Vox, and The Atlantic referenced Evans' warning about the nature of the shooter's manifesto. Evans argued that the manifesto was merely a red herring, full of references and memes meant to distract observers. Regarding whether it should ever be shared online, Evans told the Columbia Journalism Review that "pointing out things he feels are important, what radicalized and influenced him is important” with the context in which it was written.

==== Portland George Floyd protests ====
Starting in late May 2020, Evans covered the George Floyd protests in Portland, Oregon. He began reporting in the first days of the protests by taking footage of protesters, counter-protesters, and police. His reporting on the protests was highlighted in the New York Times opinion section, which published an interview with Evans after the 50th day of protests about covering the events.

In July, Evans joined a class-action lawsuit against the City of Portland for police use of force at the protests. The suit is non-monetary, seeking instead "declaratory and injunctive relief — asking the court to find the plaintiffs within their rights and to order police to stop brutalizing and unlawfully arresting protesters." Evans joined freelance journalist Bea Lake and housing services specialist Sadie Oliver-Grey as a plaintiff. The suit alleges that police officers were unlawfully violent, stopped journalists from reporting, and interfered with the right to free speech. The suit describes incidents that occurred to Evans including the "police allegedly threatening him with arrest if he did not leave the area, shooting him in the foot with a tear gas grenade and spraying him, and repeatedly shoving him".

On Saturday, August 22, a right-wing protester wielding a baton broke Evans' hand while he was filming. In an interview with The Guardian, Evans said the right-wing counter-protesters "absolutely came prepared to fight", were "very aggressive from the jump", and were equipped with "knives, guns, paintball guns with frozen pellets, batons".

=== Podcasting career ===
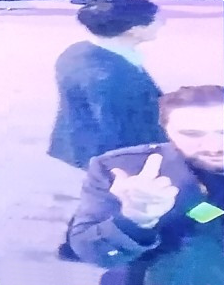
Evans in 2025, raising a middle finger towards an AI enabled security camera at CES 2025

In 2018, Evans began hosting the ongoing podcast Behind the Bastards with iHeart Media, which discusses the lives of "the worst humans in history." The show is typically structured around an informative script read by Evans with interjections from a guest co-host. In 2019, Evans began co-hosting the podcast It Could Happen Here as a discussion of the possibility of a Second American Civil War. After concluding its original nine-episode series, the show began releasing daily in 2021 and has continued to the present day discussing a variety of current events.

In 2019, Evans completed the podcast series The War on Everyone, a podcast about how white supremacy and fascism have developed and spread into the American consciousness in the modern age. Evans published a new podcast series titled The Women's War in March and April 2020 about the primarily Kurdish autonomous region in Syria known as Rojava. Evans also published a Behind the Bastards podcast miniseries titled Behind the Police in June and July 2020, covering the history of policing in the United States to inform the present time of civil unrest. Behind the Police was co-hosted by Jason "Propaganda" Petty. In November 2020 through early 2021, Evans published Uprising: A Guide From Portland, a podcast detailing first-hand accounts of the 2020 George Floyd protests in Portland, Oregon. In September 2019 through May 2022, Evans was one of three co-hosts of the podcast Worst Year Ever.

After a deal between iHeartMedia and Netflix was signed in December 2025, Behind the Bastards began streaming on Netflix in January 2026.

==== Cool Zone Media ====
In August 2021, iHeartMedia announced a launch of a new podcast network Cool Zone Media helmed by Evans, who would become its head of content. The network would unite under one umbrella both existing and upcoming podcasts from Evans and his frequent collaborators such as Jake Hanrahan and Petty.

== Podcasts ==
- After The Revolution (2021): An audiobook version of Evans' debut fiction novel
- Assault on America (2021): A mini-series that examines the events around the January 6th U.S. Capitol attack
- Behind the Bastards (2018–): Evans' flagship podcast series, featuring biographies of "the worst people in all of history", varying from Adolf Hitler to Scott Adams.
- Behind the Insurrections (2021): A mini-series detailing several historical coups, released following the 2021 United States Capitol attack
- Behind the Police (2020): A mini-series on the history of American police, released in the wake of the 2020 George Floyd protests
- Cracked Gets Personal (2017): Short-lived show Evans co-hosted with Brandon Johnson while they worked for Cracked.com.
- It Could Happen Here (2019, 2021–): Originally a mini-series about the possibility of a Second American Civil War, later relaunched as a daily podcast
- Uprising: A Guide From Portland (2021): A first-hand report and background on the then-ongoing Protests in Portland, Oregon
- The War on Everyone (2019): An audiobook where Evans details how white supremacy and fascism have developed and spread into the American consciousness in the modern age
- The Women's War (2020): Evans details his experience visiting the Autonomous Administration of Rojava
- Worst Year Ever (2019–2022): A joint project with Katy Stoll, and Cody Johnston; originally started to discuss then-upcoming 2020 United States presidential election which with the beginning of the COVID-19 pandemic pivoted to a general topic weekly series

== Bibliography ==
- Evans, Robert (2016). A Brief History of Vice: How Bad Behavior Built Civilization. Penguin Random House. ISBN 9780147517609.
- Evans, Robert (2022). After The Revolution. [S.l.]: AK Press. ISBN 978-1-84935-462-2. OCLC 1267687454.
