= Glam (magazine) =

American online fashion magazine

- Categories: Fashion
- Format: Online magazine
- Founded: September 2005
- Company: Static Media
- Country: United States
- Language: English
- Website: glam.com

Glam is an American online fashion magazine and website. It debuted at New York Fashion Week in 2005 as a publication that combined magazine-style editorial with e-commerce.

== History ==
Glam was launched in September 2005 as a fashion magazine that also functioned as a shopping platform. Its parent company was initially called Project X before adopting the Glam Media name in 2005. In 2006, Glam formed a joint initiative with Cosmopolitan. By 2007, Glam had surpassed iVillage in unique visitors. In September 2007, Glam launched a product discovery feature called Glam Curator.

In 2012, Glam launched a website called Foodie.com. In 2014, its parent company was renamed as Mode Media, which shut down its operations in 2016.

After its shutdown in 2016, its assets were acquired by BrideClick in 2017. In 2023, Indiana-based Static Media acquired it from BrideClick.
