= Leaf Group =

American online brand company

Leaf Group Ltd.
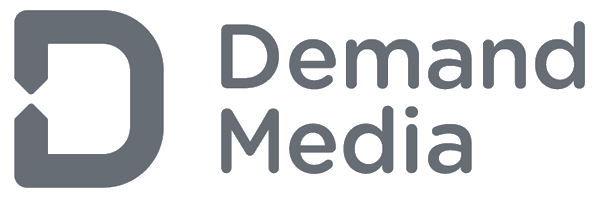
- Type: Subsidiary
- Industry: Internet
- Founded: May 1, 2006; 20 years ago Santa Monica, California, U.S.
- Headquarters: 1655 26th Street; Santa Monica, California, United States
- Key people: Sean Moriarty, Chief Executive Officer
- Revenue: US$325 million (2011)
- Owner: Graham Holdings
- Number of employees: 400 (2015)
- Website: leafgroup.com

Leaf Group, formerly Demand Media Inc., was an American content company that operates online brands, including eHow, livestrong.com, and marketplace brands Saatchi Art and Society6. The company provided social media platforms for large company websites and distributes content with social media tools to web outlets. It was commonly known for being a content farm. Demand Media was created in 2006 by a former private equity investor, Shawn Colo, and the former chairman of MySpace, Richard Rosenblatt.

The company employed an algorithm that identified topics with high advertising potential based on search engine query data and bid on advertising auctions. These topics were typically in the advice and how-to fields. It then commissioned freelancers to produce corresponding text or video content. The content was posted on a variety of sites, including YouTube and the company's own sites, such as eHow and livestrong.com.

The company was acquired by Graham Holdings in June 2021 for $323 million. In 2023, the Leaf Group was restructured to become World of Good Brands, separating Leaf’s lifestyle publishing websites – Well+Good, Livestrong, Hunker and OnlyInYourState — from its marketplace businesses, Saatchi Art and Society6. Hunker was sold to Static Media in 2024. A year later Well+Good and Livestrong was sold to Ziff Davis and Only In Your State was sold to Launch Potato. After the sales, the World of Good Brands ceased and all staff in the division were laid off.

== Offerings ==
=== Content & Media ===
Demand Media's Content & Media service offering includes leading online properties that publish content in text, video, photography, and designed visual formats. This content is published across several key categories on eHow.com. It also owns and operates LEAFtv, a lifestyle resource for women that produces short-form how-to videos. Additionally, its studioD business develops and executes content marketing strategies, and creates custom content for third-party brands, agencies and publishers.

=== Marketplaces ===
Through its Marketplace service offering, Demand Media operates two art and design marketplaces where one can market and sell artworks or designs printed on a variety of products.

Society6.com, which it acquired in June 2013, provides an online commerce platform to sell images or designs on consumer products.

SaatchiArt.com, which it acquired in August 2014, is an online art gallery for the purpose of selling works.

In 2017, Leaf Group acquired Deny Designs, a modern home furnishings company based in Colorado.

== History ==
Demand Media was co-founded in May 2006 by Richard Rosenblatt and Shawn Colo. Rosenblatt was chief executive officer of Intermix Media and Chairman of MySpace.com. Colo is a financial acquisition specialist. He worked for 10 years in the private equity industry as a principal with Spectrum Equity Investors, specializing in media and communications companies. In June 2007, Demand Media hired Charles Hilliard, a former Morgan Stanley investment banker, NetZero/United Online senior executive and initial public offering (IPO) specialist, as its president and chief financial officer and acquired Byron Reese's how-to website, ExpertVillage.com of Austin, Texas, for about $20 million. Reese became the company's chief innovation officer and developed the algorithm that the company uses to identify topics with high advertising potential.

In 2007, Demand Media raised more than $355 million in financing over its first two years from investors such as Oak Investment Partners, Spectrum Equity Investors, Generation Partners and Goldman Sachs.

By 2008, Demand Media had acquired more than 30 domain-name portfolios and owned 65 destination websites. It said that its 2009 revenue was nearly $200 million, but it was later reported that the company had never been profitable. In July 2008, it was reported that Yahoo! was interested in buying Demand Media for between $1.5 billion and $2 billion. Sources close to both companies said Yahoo! executives were interested in Demand Media's advertising impressions and its ability to create niche social networks for media sites. Demand Media CEO Richard Rosenblatt later said that the company was not for sale. It was reported that Rosenblatt wanted a price closer to $3 billion for Demand Media.

In August, 2014, Demand Media acquired online art-gallery marketplace Saatchi Art and named the startup's top executive, Sean Moriarty, as the new CEO of Demand Media Inc.

The company changed its name to Leaf Group in 2016.

On June 10, 2021, Leaf announced shareholders had approved an acquisition by Graham Holdings for $8.50 per share in an all-cash transaction valued at approximately $323 million.

== Acquisitions and dispositions ==
Starting in 2006, Demand Media acquired a collection of sites and relaunched them with social networking features and video capabilities. In the company's first six months, it made nine acquisitions, including the purchase of registrars eNom and BulkRegister. On November 6, 2008, Shawn Colo, head of Demand Media mergers and acquisitions, said the company would continue to buy niche, well-trafficked sites because the company was profitable and still had "a lot of cash in the bank".

In 2008, Demand Media acquired Pluck, a company providing social networking and commenting solutions to other websites, for a reported $75 million in cash. IndieClick and RSS Graffiti were acquired in August 2011. Name.com, a domain name registrar, was acquired on January 7, 2013. Society6 was acquired on June 25, 2013. Saatchi Online was acquired on August 11, 2014.

In August 2014, Demand Media announced it had successfully separated from Rightside Group, Ltd. and its brands eNom, Name.com and online auction site NameJet. As a result of the separation, and the registrars' later sale to Donuts Inc, Demand Media is no longer a provider of domain name services.

In April 2016, Demand Media announced the sale of its brand, Cracked.com, to E.W. Scripps. In May 2016, Demand Media announced the sale of its brand trails.com to LoveToKnow Corp. (owned by Howard Love).

In February 2017, Demand Media's Airliners.net site was acquired by VerticalScope, majority-owned by Torstar. In 2018, Leaf acquired the website Well+Good. In February 2019, Leaf acquired the website OnlyInYourState.

In 2021, Leaf Group was purchased in an all-cash offer by Graham Holdings.

== Business model ==
Demand Media executives say their websites are content-driven to attract visitors by showing up in multiword search-engine queries. The more words that are typed into a search engine, the more specific the search will be. This is called "the long tail" search. It then tries to retain visitors with related content and social media tools. Its social media platforms get 3 billion interactions per month for clients with already well-established brands. Demand Media commissions specific website content that it then distributes to its own websites and others where it has advertising revenue sharing agreements. As of 2008, Demand Media owned 135,000 videos and 340,000 articles. It was claimed to be one of the largest contributors to YouTube, uploading between 10,000 and 20,000 new videos per month and getting about 1.5 million page views per day on YouTube.

Content is generated via a process in which Demand Media uses algorithms to generate titles, then posts the titles to a screened pool of freelance writers or video creators. The list of available titles used to be over 100,000 but was severely curtailed in the second half of 2011. Typically, writers can claim up to ten titles and then have a week to submit the articles. Format and length are dictated by guidelines. Submitted articles go to an editor (also a freelancer), who can either clean them up or request a rewrite. After writers submit a revised article, it is either accepted or rejected. Payment via PayPal is twice a week.

Pluck.com's content comes with advertising. The website owners get free content for their sites and split the advertising revenue with Demand Media.

== Stock offer ==
In April 2010, the Financial Times reported that Demand Media was planning an initial public offering of shares (IPO). The IPO filing was completed in August of that year. Shares were initially expected to be offered in December 2010 that would give Demand Media a value of some $1.5 billion. However, as a result of a Securities and Exchange Commission investigation regarding the company's novel accounting for "long-lived content", the pricing was delayed.

On January 12, 2011, the company announced it would price its shares between $14 and $16 each, giving it a valuation of approximately $1.3 billion. Questions were raised about Demand Media's claim to be profitable, given that its IPO filings had reported losses for the past several years.

On December 14, 2020, the company announced the closing of its underwritten public offering of 8,216,750 shares of its common stock, including full exercise of the underwriter’s option to purchase additional shares of common stock, at a public offering price of $4.20 per share, receiving an aggregate net proceeds from the offering of approximately $32.0 million.

== Criticism ==
Demand Media has attracted criticism for being one of the largest buyers of articles and videos, often commissioning low-quality articles to cut costs in an effort to mass-produce articles and videos to appear highly in Google search results, purchasing thousands of search-engine-driven content from low-paid freelancers to use on its websites to attract advertisers, such as Israeli startup Simpli (now owned by Google's AdSense).

Demand Media was criticized for its methods of accounting, such as capitalizing the costs of content and amortizing them over five years, giving them the appearance of profitability.
