= Black squirrel =

Melanistic squirrel

A melanistic eastern gray squirrel

Black squirrels are a melanistic subgroup of squirrels with black coloration on their fur. The phenomenon occurs with several species of squirrels, although it is most frequent with the eastern gray squirrel (Sciurus carolinensis) and the fox squirrel (Sciurus niger). Black morphs of the eastern gray and fox squirrels are the result of a variant pigment gene. Several theories have surfaced as to why the black morph occurs, with some suggesting that the black morph is a selective advantage for squirrels inhabiting the northern ranges of the species, with the black fur providing a thermal advantage over its non-melanistic counterpart.

Black squirrels share the same natural range as their non-melanistic counterparts. Black morphs of eastern gray squirrels occur most frequently in the northern portion of its range around the Great Lakes Basin. Conversely, black morphs of fox squirrels typically occur most frequently in the southeastern portions of the species' natural range, the southeastern United States. Although they are found more frequently in those regions, the coloration remains uncommon in most areas that these species inhabit. However, black morphs of eastern gray squirrels form the majority of the species' population in the Canadian province of Ontario, and the U.S. state of Michigan. In addition to their natural range, black morphs of eastern gray squirrels were also introduced into other areas of Canada, the United Kingdom, and the United States during the 19th and 20th centuries.

Several municipalities and post-secondary schools in the United States have adopted a black squirrel for branding purposes using it as a symbol or mascot. Some municipalities that have adopted the black squirrels as a symbol for their community have also passed ordinances that discourage attempts to threaten them.

== Description ==
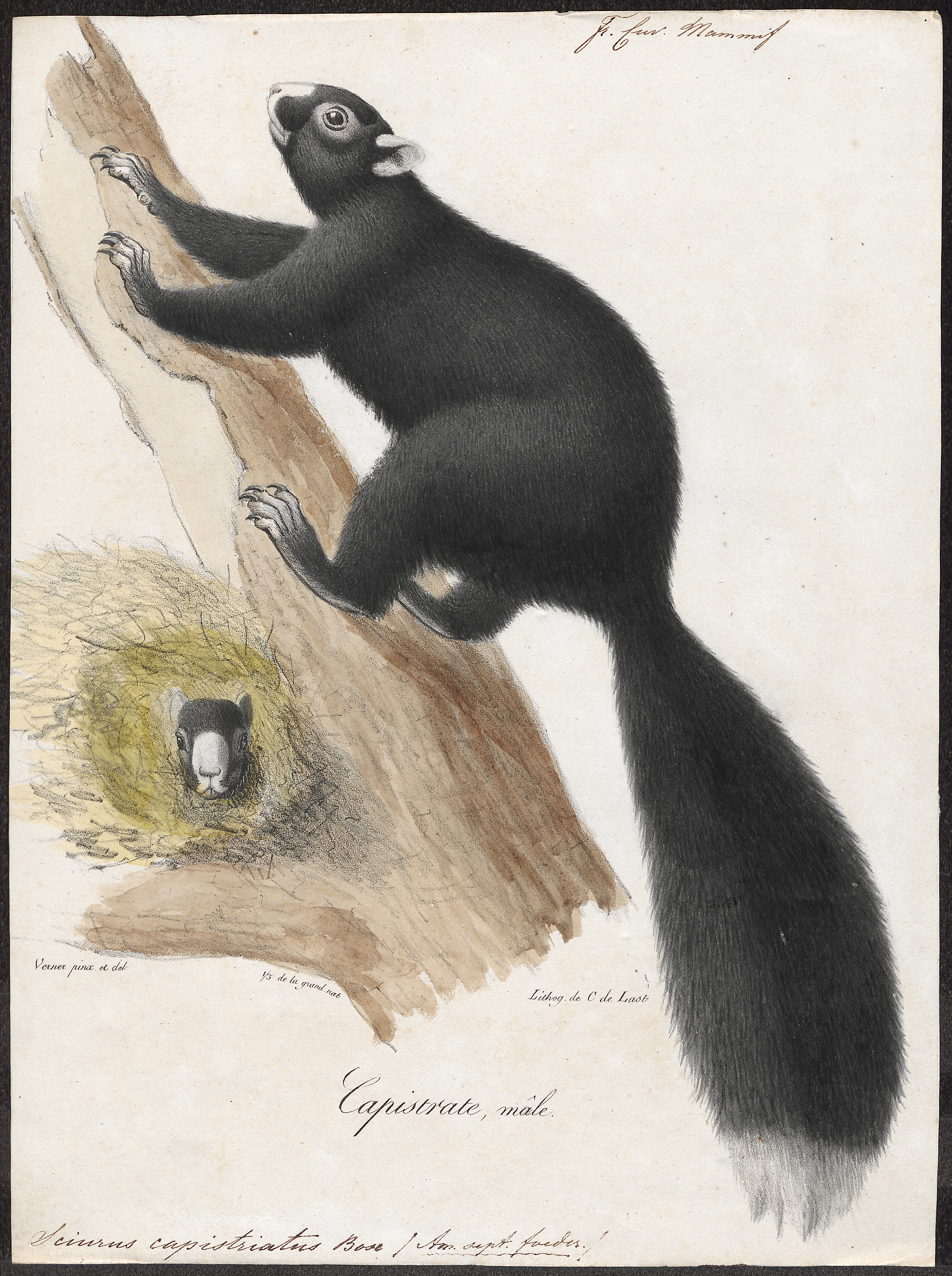
Depiction of a melanistic fox squirrel. The variant gene responsible for black eastern gray squirrels originated from the fox squirrel.

The black coloration in both eastern gray squirrels and fox squirrels is believed to stem from a variant pigment gene. A study published by FEBS Letters in 2014 demonstrated how a pigment gene missing a piece of DNA, can be a determinant of an eastern gray squirrel's coat. The emergence of black fur in the eastern gray squirrel is believed to be the result of the 24 bp deletion from their melanocortin 1 receptor (MC1R) gene; with the specific allele referred to as MC1R∆24. A study published by BMC Evolutionary Biology pointed to evidence that the variant pigment gene originated from the black fox squirrel, and was later passed on to eastern gray squirrels as a result of interspecies mating; given that the variant gene in both species were identical. Black coat color is caused by a 24 base pair deletion in MC1R in the western population of fox squirrels and by a point mutation in the agouti-signaling protein gene in the southeastern population.

Black morphs may also occur with Columbian ground squirrels, Eurasian red squirrels, Richardson's ground squirrels, and western gray squirrels, although it is far more unusual for the latter to display color polymorphism. No association between melanism and variations in their MC1R was found in Eurasian red squirrels; with researchers suggesting that the different color variations (including black morphs) in Eurasian red squirrels, and fox squirrels being a polygenic result. Melanism with Richardson's ground squirrels is due to recessive genes.

=== Benefits of black fur ===
With regard to black squirrels and melanism, two major theories dominate the literature that its frequency is the result of crypsis or the result of thermoregulation.

==== Concealment ====
It has been theorized that non-melanistic gray squirrels have a concealment advantage in forests dominated by deciduous trees, while black squirrels hold a concealment advantage in forested areas in the northern portions of its range, where conifer trees are more prevalent. The theory is based on the idea that forests where coniferous trees are predominant block more sunlight from reaching the forest below, providing a dimly-lit habitat in which a darker-coated squirrel could better conceal itself compared to its lighter counterpart. It is also suggested that non-melanistic squirrels have a concealment advantage over their melanistic counterparts in deciduous forests because deciduous trees shed their leaves on a seasonal basis, illuminating the forested area below it during the winter season. A study conducted in 1989 on melanistic fox squirrels found the non-melanistic coloration better for concealment while the squirrel was still, but a melanistic coloration provided better concealment for when it was in motion.

The frequency of black morph eastern gray squirrels is thought to have been once relatively common throughout the eastern gray squirrel range, although their frequency and population have dwindled since the 1700s. It has been suggested that their population declined due to extensive deforestation and the hunting of squirrels for their meat and pelts; with the newly changed environment providing non-melanistic gray-colored squirrels an advantage in concealment. However, the theory that the black morphs squirrels were more prevalent prior to the 1700s, and that deforestation led to their decline has been challenged by some researchers. One study found a high frequency of black eastern gray squirrels lived in rural southern Ontario, an area primarily made up of farmland.

Melanism in fox squirrels in the southeast portion of its natural range has also been associated with crypsis, as it inhabits forests that go through periodic burnings. It has been suggested that black squirrels would be harder to detect in forests already burned, due to the blackened substrate.

==== Thermoregulation ====
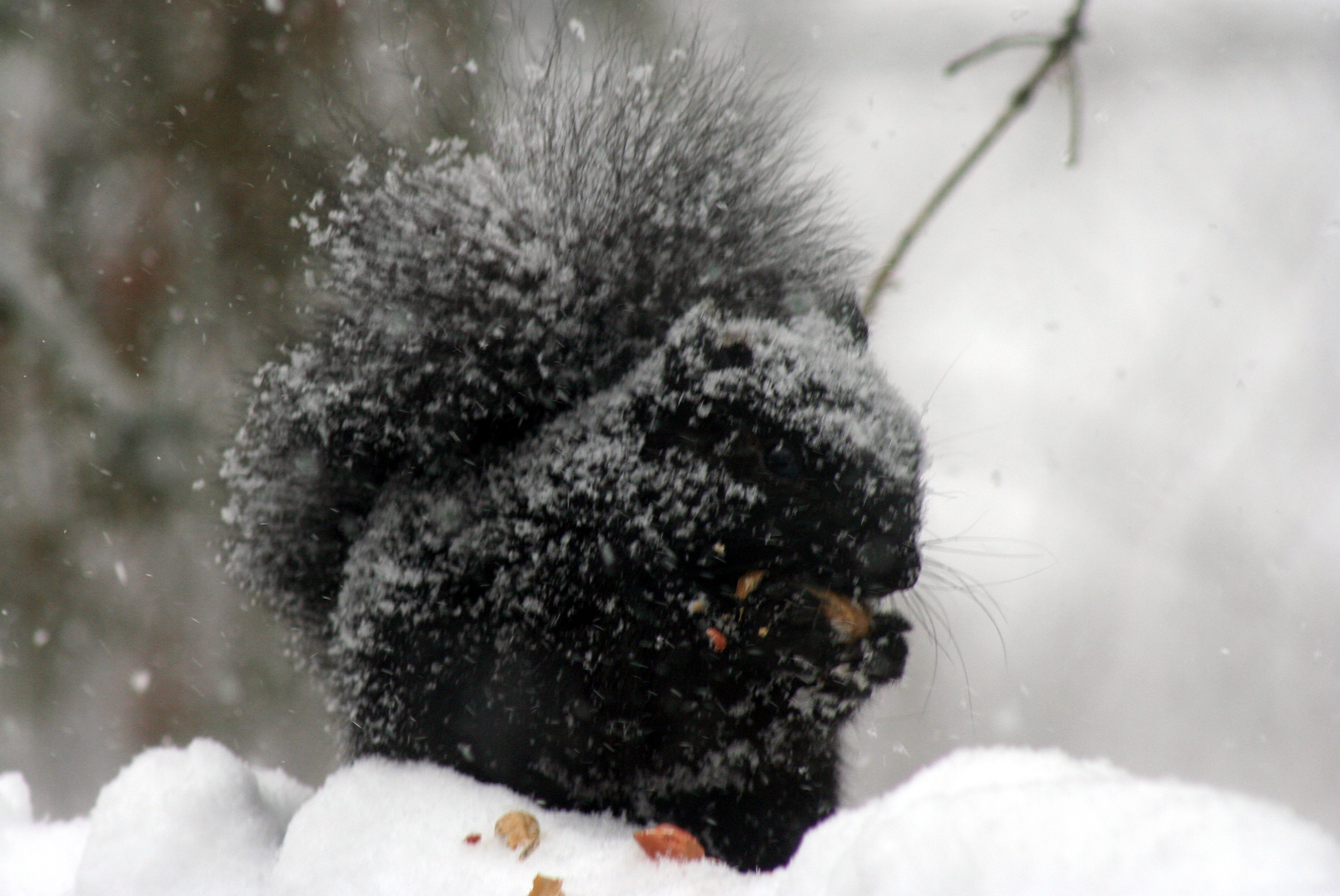
A black squirrel in winter in Stirling, Ontario. Heat retention in cold weather has been theorized as a benefit of melanism.

It has also been suggested that black morph squirrels have a considerably higher cold tolerance than gray squirrels given the color of their coat. Black-coated animals were found to have 18 percent lower heat loss in temperatures below −10 °C (14 °F), a 20 percent lower metabolic rate, and a non-shivering thermogenesis capacity that is higher than a gray morph. Additionally, researchers of the color morph have noted a strong negative correlation with the frequency of black squirrels and areas with high air temperature.

The black coat has been suggested as a selective advantage for squirrels inhabiting the northern ranges of the species, as it helps them inhabit colder regions. The apparent thermal advantage has contributed to the expansion of the eastern gray squirrel's range northward following the end of the last glacial period. Black morph eastern gray squirrels have been reported as far north as Sudbury, Ontario, past the traditional range of the eastern gray squirrels.

A study published by the European Journal of Ecology in 2019 on eastern fox squirrels found that the melanistic morphs of the species saw a noticeable increase in their surface temperature (fur and skin) in both sunny and cloudy weather; whereas the non-melanistic fox squirrels only saw their surface temperature increase when it was sunny with no cloud cover. Its ability to gain heat in sunny and cloudy conditions is believed to be the reason why melanistic squirrels are more active during winter mornings. However, the same study noted that there was no difference in metabolic heat production between the color morphs.

=== Reproduction ===
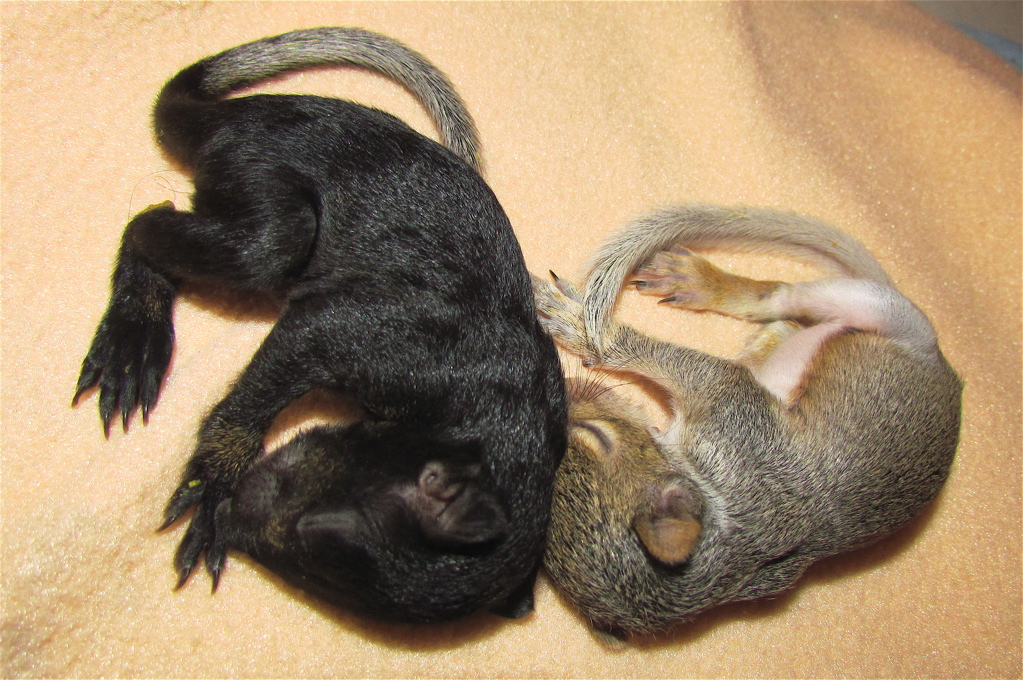
Juvenile grey squirrels – one black, one with normal colouration – from two different litters

Among eastern squirrels, gray mating pairs cannot produce black offspring. Gray squirrels have two copies of a gray pigment gene and black squirrels have either one or two copies of a black pigment gene. If a black squirrel has two copies of the black gene it will be jet black. If it has one copy of a black gene and one gray gene it will be brown-black. Approximately nine percent of melanistic eastern gray squirrels are believed to be jet black. In areas with high concentrations of black squirrels, litters of mixed-color individuals are common.

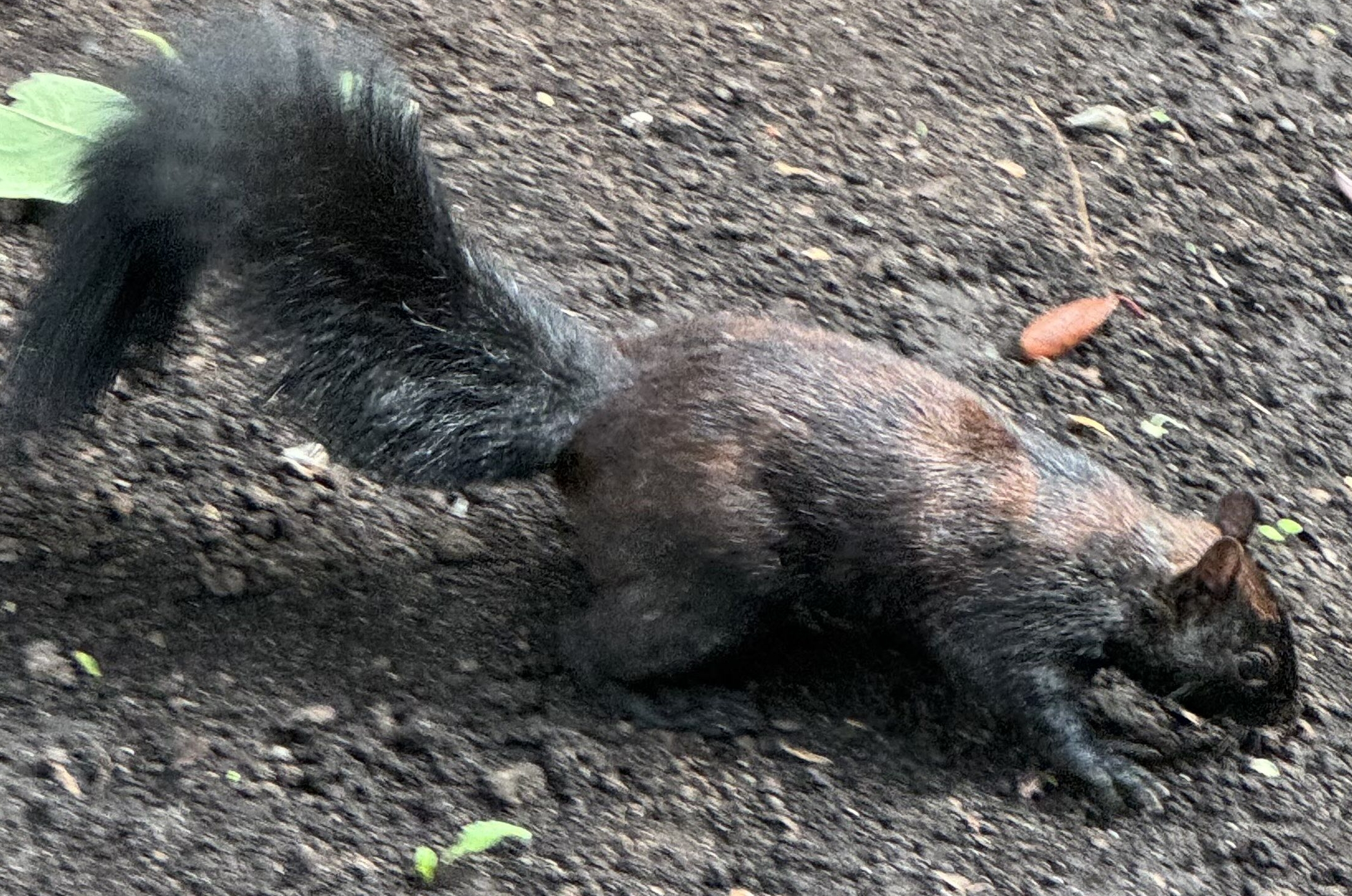
The brown-black coloration of one black and one gray gene

== Differences with non-melanistic squirrels ==
A study conducted in 1990 of black and gray morphs of the eastern gray squirrel concluded that there was no major difference in behavior between the morphs. The same study also found no difference between the morphs when reacting to either a human or canid predator. However, another study in 2010 also found that gray morphs of the eastern gray squirrel were more prone to initiate flight than black morphs after hearing a red-tailed hawk; although the fact that black morphs were less likely to initiate flight after hearing a red-tailed hawk may not be an effect of pigmentation, rather the environment they inhabit. Given the higher frequency of black morphs in an urban setting, it has been suggested that black morphs have a higher tolerance for human/urban stimuli. It has also been suggested that behavioral differences with regard to mating may exist between the urban and rural populations of eastern gray squirrels.

A 2019 study on fox squirrels found that there was no noticeable difference in metabolism between the different color morphs of that species. However, the same study on fox squirrels found that melanistic fox squirrels were more active than their non-melanistic counterparts during the winter and spring months, with melanistic fox squirrels found to be 30 percent more active during the mornings than their non-melanistic counterparts. Conversely the non-melanistic fox squirrels were more active during the autumn season. It has been suggested that the black squirrel's higher heat gain for its surface temperature is the reason why they are able to be active earlier in the day and remain active longer.

== Distribution ==
Natural populations of black morph eastern gray and fox squirrels can be found in the natural ranges of both species in North America, although their frequency varies depending on the area. Black fur for both species of squirrels is rare and occurs at rates of less than one percent. It has been suggested that one in 10,000 eastern gray squirrels are a black morph.

It has been suggested that the frequency of the black color morph in the eastern gray squirrel populations has declined since the late 1700s, especially south of the Great Lakes. There is a higher frequency of the black morph in the northern portions of the eastern gray squirrel's range; which includes the southern portions of central Canada and northern United States. In particular, large populations of black squirrels are found within the Great Lakes Basin, with a notable increase in their frequency between the 41st parallel north and the 45th parallel north.

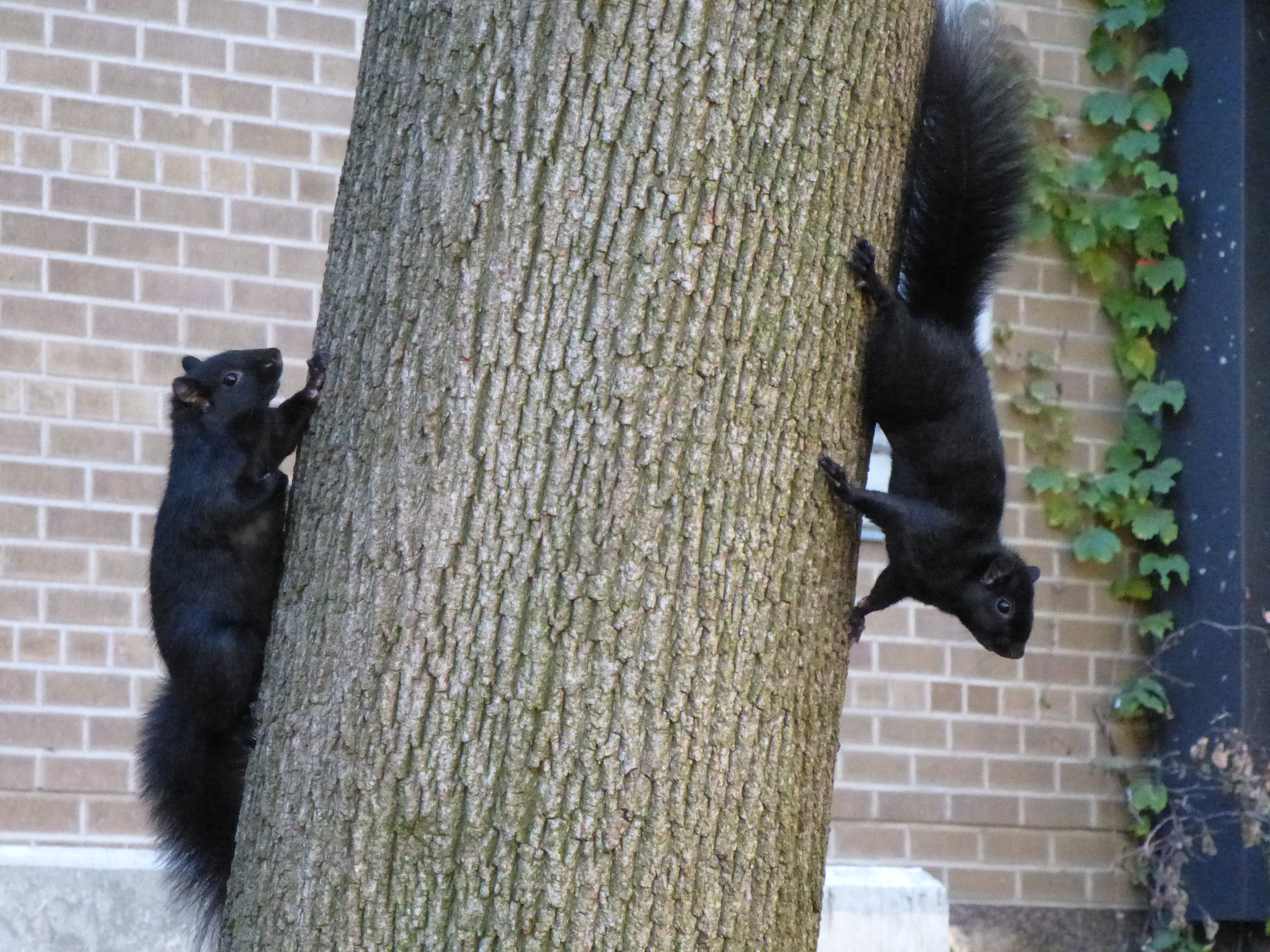
Jet-black eastern gray squirrels in Toronto, Ontario. Urban populations of the species were found to have a higher frequency of black morphs.

Black squirrels occur with the highest frequency in Ontario and Michigan, and are the predominant color morph found in those areas; with the black morph accounting for 66 percent of squirrels documented on iNaturalist in Ontario, and 56 percent in Michigan. Significant populations of black morphs are also present in the other provinces/states that surround the Great Lakes; with approximately 15 percent of the eastern grey squirrels in those regions reported to be melanistic. Black squirrel populations south of the Great Lakes remain largely localized, with the frequency of black squirrels varying from one region to another. Black squirrels were found to be more common in urban areas as opposed to rural areas and forests. Among exurban populations of eastern gray squirrels, the black morph only occurs in high frequencies in Ontario and northern Michigan.

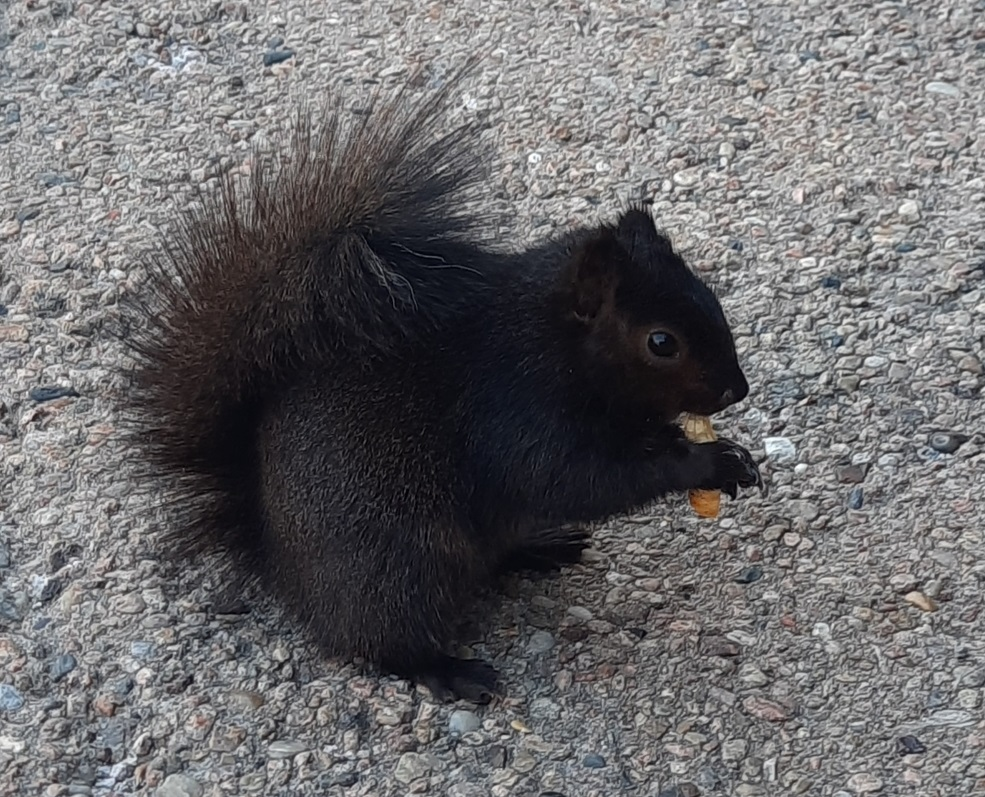
A melanistic fox squirrel eating a fry on the University of Nebraska–Lincoln campus. All black squirrels in Nebraska are fox squirrels.

Conversely, black morphs of fox squirrels occur with the highest frequency in the southeastern portion of its natural range, the southeastern United States. Like the eastern gray squirrels, the frequency of black fox squirrels is dependent on the area, reaching a maximum frequency of 13 percent. Although they occur more frequently in the southeastern United States, large populations of black morph fox squirrels may be found in other areas of the species' natural range; including Council Bluffs, Iowa, around the Missouri River. Approximately half of the fox squirrels found in Council Bluffs are melanistic. Melanistic fox squirrels in Council Bluffs have since expanded across the Missouri River to other areas in the Omaha–Council Bluffs metropolitan area; with melanistic fox squirrels now accounting for 4.6 to 7.6 percent of fox squirrels in Omaha.

The Delta fox squirrel (Sciurus niger subauratus) is a subspecies of fox squirrel found in the Mississippi Alluvial Valley. There are two common phases, a glossy solid black phase and a reddish phase that lacks the white markings of the fox squirrels found in the surrounding hill country.

=== Introduced populations ===
==== Reintroduction programs ====
Several populations of black morph squirrels were the result of reintroduction and repopulation programs intended to reintroduce the species or the black morph to areas they once inhabited but had been wiped out by human hunting and predators in previous centuries.

Black squirrels in Washington, D.C., originated from eighteen black morphs captured at Rondeau Provincial Park in Ontario and released in the parks around the National Mall in 1902 and in 1906 by Teddy Roosevelt. There remains a level of uncertainty as to why the black morphs were introduced into the National Mall; although representatives from the Smithsonian Museum suggest their introduction may have been part of a larger effort to revitalize the local eastern gray squirrel population whittled down by human hunting. By the 1960s, the black morphs had spread beyond the parks that surround the National Mall, although were largely contained by the Capital Beltway. In 2005, it was estimated that black morphs comprised between 5 and 25 percent of all eastern gray squirrels in that area.

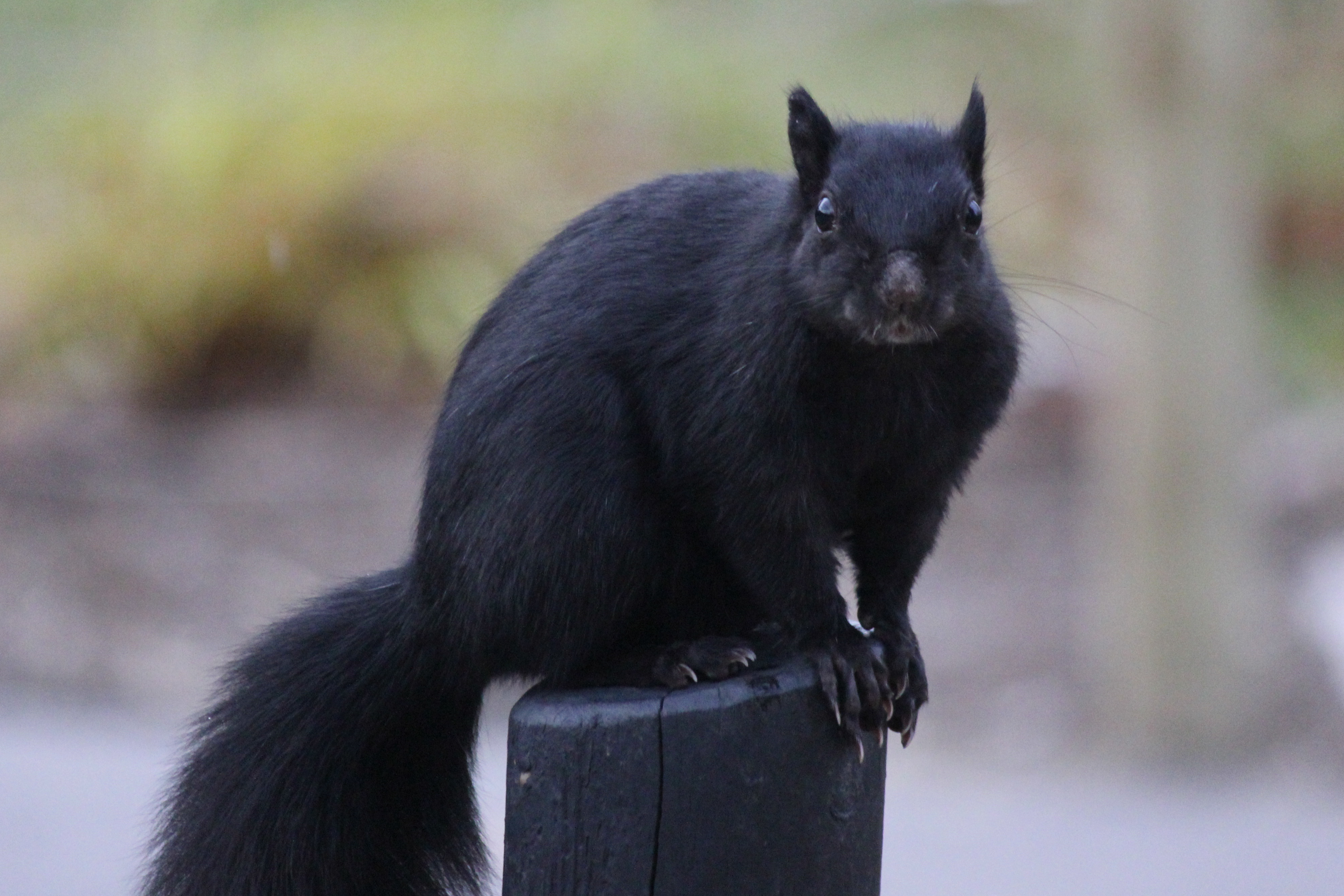
A black eastern grey squirrel near Michigan State University in East Lansing. The morphs around the university originated from the reintroduced population in Battle Creek, Michigan.

The present population of black eastern gray squirrels in Battle Creek, Michigan, was reportedly introduced in 1915 by John Harvey Kellogg, who wanted to repopulate the area with the species after their populations were devastated in the previous centuries by predators and human hunters. He reportedly received 400 eastern gray squirrels from Kent County, Michigan, including some black morphs, and released them into the community. Researchers north of Battle Creek, at the Kellogg Biological Station, later trapped some black morph eastern gray squirrels in 1958 and 1962, and released them on the East Lansing campus of Michigan State University at the behest of the university's president.

Black morphs were once present in Ohio, although the color morph was extirpated from the state by 1930. However, an initiative to reintroduce the black morphs into the squirrel population was undertaken in 1961 by Kent State University, based in Portage County. The university, in coordination from the Canadian and U.S. governments, released ten black squirrels from London, Ontario onto its campus grounds in an effort to reintroduce the black morphs into the area. By 1964, the Record-Courier reported the number of black squirrel increased to 150. Black morphs of the eastern gray squirrels have since expanded through northeastern Ohio.

==== Introduced/non-native populations ====
Several populations of black morph squirrels were introduced into the area by accident. Some of these black morph populations have been embraced by their communities, although others are viewed as an invasive species to the local ecosystem.

The introduction of black squirrels in the Quad Cities occurred in the 19th century. According to one story, recounted in the book The Palmers, they were first introduced on the Rock Island Arsenal by either the Palmer family or the base commander. According to the story, some of the black morphs later escaped the arsenal by jumping across ice floes on the Mississippi River when it was frozen, and populated the other areas on Rock Island.

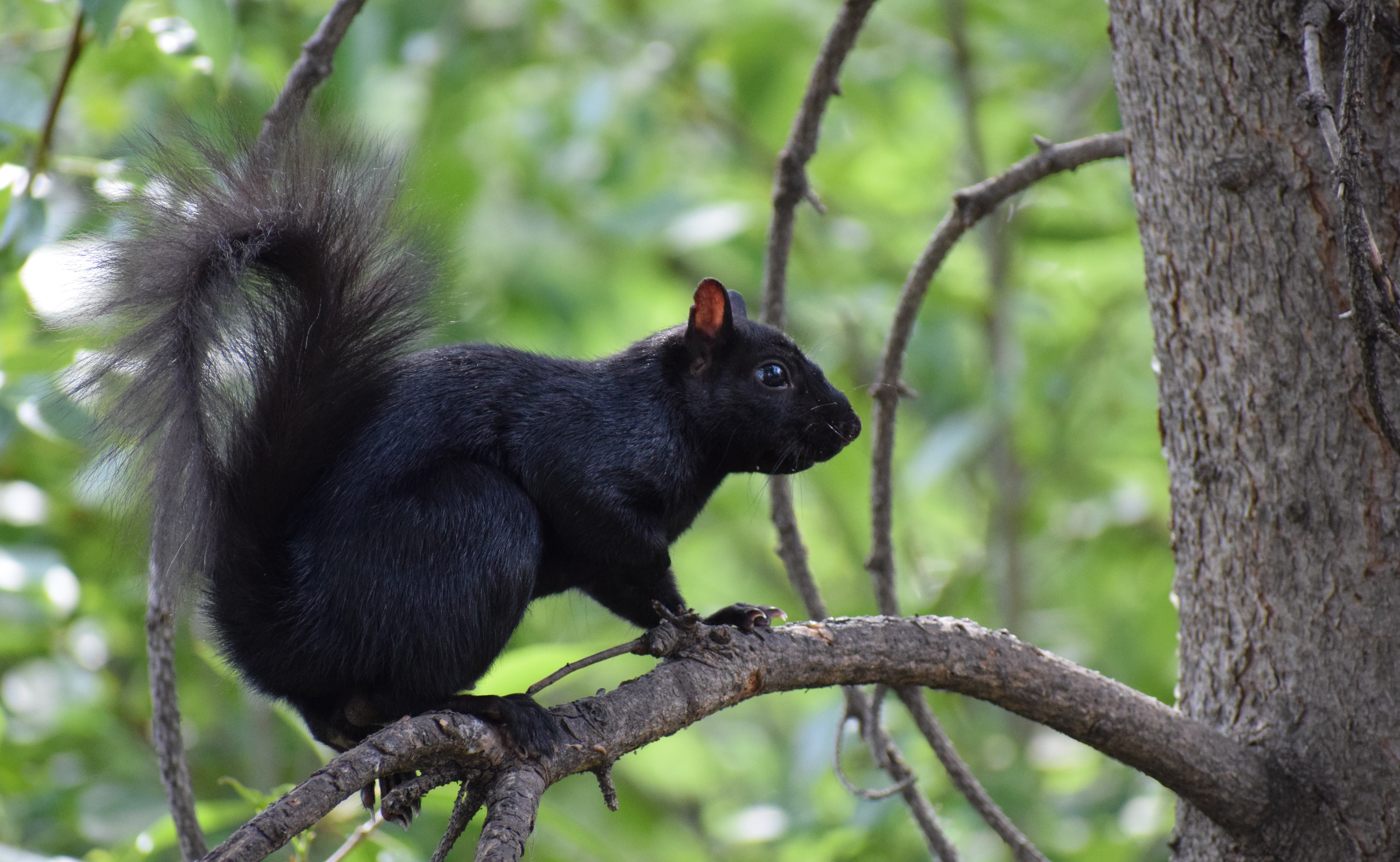
A black eastern gray squirrel in Calgary, Alberta. The species was introduced into the area in the 1930s.

Eastern gray squirrels, including their black morphs, were introduced into British Columbia during the early 1900s. The species was also later introduced into other areas of Canada to which it was not native, such as Calgary, Alberta. The majority of the eastern gray squirrels in Calgary originated as pets, or zoo animals that escaped captivity during the 1930s. As in Ontario, black eastern gray squirrels are now the predominant morph of the species found in Calgary.

The black morph population in Marysville, Kansas, were supposedly released into the area by accident. Reportedly the black morphs were brought to Marysville during the 1920s as a part of an exhibit for a circus, but were accidentally released after a child opened the cage holding the black morphs. Attempts to replicate Marysville city branding success with the black squirrels was also attempted by residents of Hobbs, New Mexico; who reportedly took some black morphs from Marysville to populate Hobbs. However, they were unsuccessful in introducing the black morphs into Hobbs, with the local squirrel population reportedly killing the black squirrels that were released there.

The population of black squirrels in Massachusetts's Pioneer Valley originated from two shipments of Michigan black squirrels sent to Frank Stanley Beveridge, the founder of Stanley Park in Westfield. Beveridge reportedly released the black squirrels into the park he established during the late 1940s. The population of black squirrels has since spread throughout the Pioneer Valley, with large populations existing in Amherst and Westfield. Black squirrels are also present around suburban Boston and the Springfield, Massachusetts area. During this same period, black squirrels from Canada were also released at parks in Princeton, New Jersey.

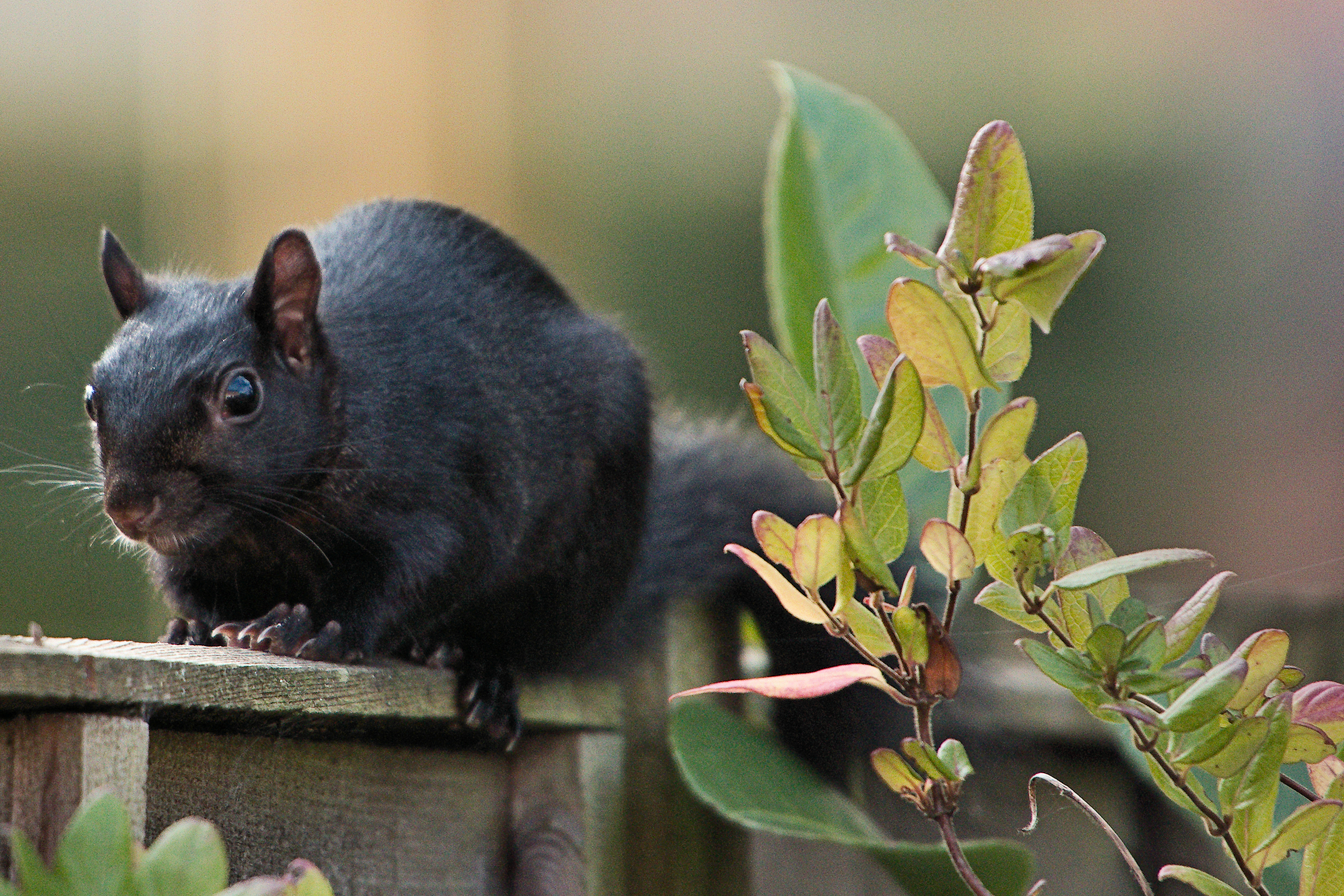
A black eastern gray squirrel atop a fence in Hertfordshire, U.K.

Black morphs of eastern gray squirrels are also present in the United Kingdom. The black squirrel population in the UK originates from black morphs brought over from North America, as opposed to a mutation that occurred with the existing population of non-melanistic eastern gray squirrels. However, how the species was introduced into the country's ecosystem remains undetermined. Some suggest the black morph population originated from squirrels released into the wild in the 19th century, while others assert the population originated from black morphs in zoos that escaped captivity. The first black squirrel to be recorded in the wild in the United Kingdom was in 1912, in Woburn, Bedfordshire. By 2009, the black morph accounted for nearly half of all squirrels in Cambridgeshire and in other areas of England, including Hertfordshire and Bedfordshire. There are an estimated 25,000 black morphs squirrels in the East of England in 2009. However, as eastern gray squirrels (both non-melanistic and black morphs) threaten the local Eurasian red squirrel population, local authorities have begun to regulate and control the spread of the species in parts of England.

== In culture ==
Black squirrels have been adopted by several cities and post-secondary institutions in the United States for the purposes of public relations branding, often making the black morphs a mascot.

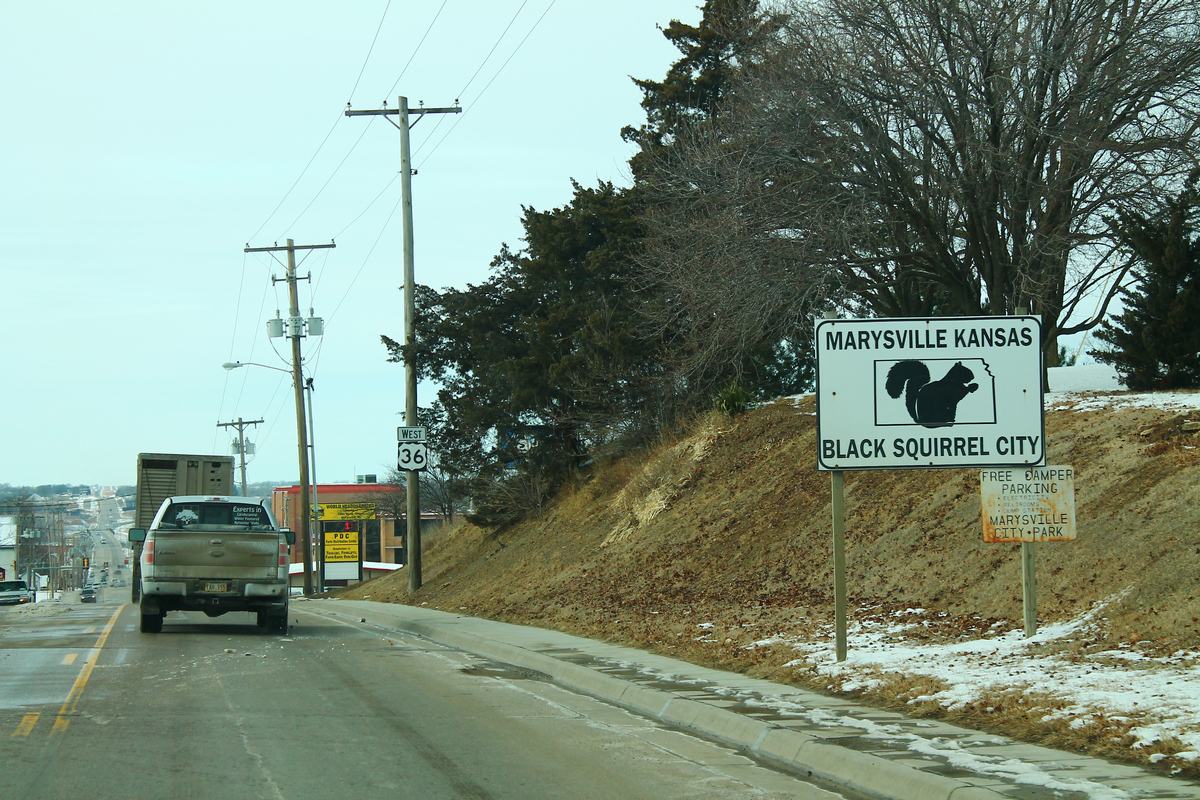
Signage in Marysville, Kansas, featuring a black squirrel, the city's official mascot

The city of Marysville, Kansas, adopted the black morph squirrels as an official mascot of the city in 1972, and the "Black Squirrel Song" becoming the town's official anthem in 1987. The same legislation that made it an official mascot provided the "mascots" the freedom to trespass on all city property, "immunity" from all traffic regulations, and the "first pick of all black walnuts growing within the city". Marysville is one of several communities in the United States that have enacted specific legislation to protect the black morph populations, given their low frequency south of the Great Lakes. Other cities that provide legal protection for black squirrels include Council Bluffs, Iowa; which enacted an ordinance that discourages attempts to threaten them.

Several universities also use a black squirrel as an "unofficial" mascot or symbol for their institutions for public relations purposes. Post-secondary institutions typically adopt the black squirrel as an informal mascot for branding purposes, in an effort to further their recognition and visibility and to present an image of a "fun college campus". The black squirrel has been used as an "unofficial" mascot of Kent State University and Portage County, Ohio, since the late 20th century. Kent State University hosts an annual Black Squirrel Festival, which commemorates the introduction of the species on the university campus in 1961. In 2009, a statue of a black squirrel was unveiled on the campus. The Kent State University Press named a trade imprint Black Squirrel Books, after the black morph eastern gray squirrels that inhabit its campus. Other post-secondary institutions that have also attracted print and digital publicity for their relationship with black squirrels includes Augustana College, the College of Wooster, and Sarah Lawrence College. The athletics program for Haverford College, the Haverford Fords, also adopted the black squirrel as an official mascot.

=== Literature ===
Black squirrels are major characters in British author Robin Jarvis's fantasy trilogies The Deptford Mice and The Deptford Histories, which feature anthropomorphic animals. They are portrayed as being of royal blood and are regarded as the wisest and noblest type of squirrel.

In Celtic folklore, black squirrels were associated with magic, occult knowledge, and the otherworld.

Black squirrels inhabit the forest of Mirkwood in the legendarium of J. R. R. Tolkien.

== See also ==
- Black cat
- Black panther
- Black tiger
- Black wolf
- White squirrel
