= Group size measures =

Sizes of animal groups

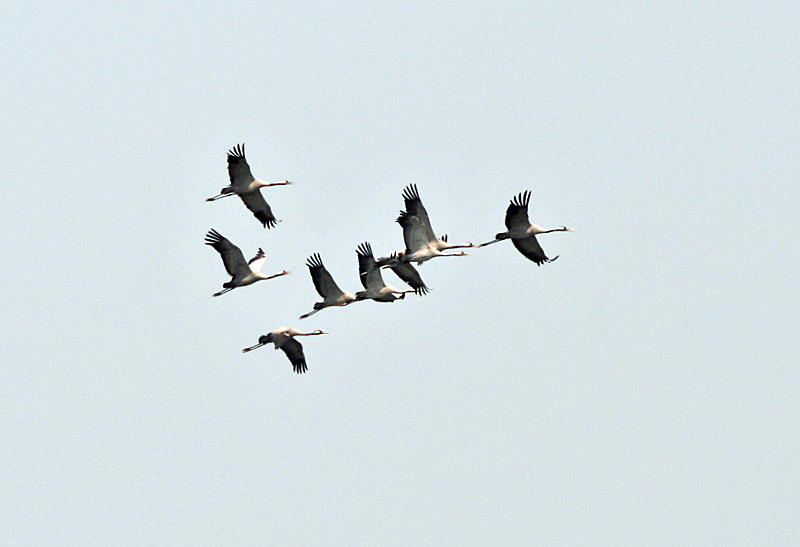
A group acts as a social environment of individuals: a flock of nine common cranes.

Many animals, including humans, tend to live in groups, herds, flocks, bands, packs, shoals, or colonies (hereafter: groups) of conspecific individuals. The size of these groups, as expressed by the number of people/etc in a group such as eight groups of nine people in each one, is an important aspect of their social environment. Group size tend to be highly variable even within the same species, thus we often need statistical measures to quantify group size and statistical tests to compare these measures between two or more samples. Group size measures are notoriously hard to handle statistically since groups sizes typically follow an aggregated (right-skewed) distribution: most groups are small, few are large, and a very few are very large.

Statistical measures of group size roughly fall into two categories.

== Outsiders' view of group size ==
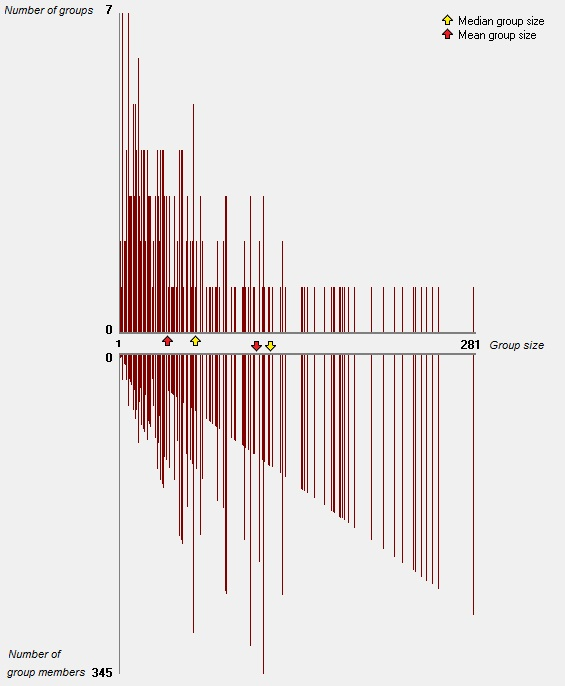
Colony size measures for rooks breeding in Normandy. The distribution of colonies (vertical axis above) and the distribution of individuals (vertical axis below) across the size classes of colonies (horizontal axis). The number of individuals is given in pairs. Animal group size data tend to exhibit aggregated (right-skewed) distributions, i.e. most groups are small, a few are large, and a very few are very large. Note that average individuals live in colonies larger than the average colony size. (Data from Normandy, 1999-2000 (smoothed), Debout, 2003)

- Group size is the number of individuals within a group;
- Mean group size, the arithmetic mean of group sizes averaged over groups;
- Confidence interval for mean group size;
- Median group size, the median of group sizes calculated over groups;
- Confidence interval for median group size.

== Insiders' view of group size ==
As Jarman (1974) pointed out, average individuals live in groups larger than average. Therefore, when we wish to characterize a typical (average) individual's social environment, we should apply non-parametric estimations of group size. Reiczigel et al. (2008) proposed the following measures:

- Crowding is the size (the number of individuals) of a group that a particular individual lives in (equals to group size: one for a solitary individual, two for both individuals in a group of two, etc.). Practically, it describes the social environment of one particular individual. This was called Individual Group Size in Jovani & Mavor's (2011) paper.;
- Mean crowding, i.e. the arithmetic mean of crowding measures averaged over individuals (this was called "Typical Group Size" according to Jarman's 1974 terminology);
- Confidence interval for mean crowding.

== Example ==
Imagine a sample with three groups, where group sizes are one, two, and six individuals, respectively, then

mean group size (group sizes averaged over groups) equals $(1+2+6)/3=3$;
mean crowding (group sizes averaged over individuals) equals $(1+2+2+6+6+6+6+6+6)/9=4.555$.

Generally speaking, given there are G groups with sizes n_{1}, n_{2}, ..., n_{G}, mean crowding can be calculated as:

mean crowding=$\sum_{i=1}^G n^2_i/\sum_{i=1}^G n_i$

== Statistical methods ==
Due to the aggregated (right-skewed) distribution of group members among groups, the application of parametric statistics would be misleading. Another problem arises when analyzing crowding values. Crowding data consist of non-independent values, or ties, which show multiple and simultaneous changes due to a single biological event. (Say, all group members' crowding values change simultaneously whenever an individual joins or leaves.)

Reiczigel et al. (2008) discuss the statistical problems associated with group size measures (calculating confidence intervals, two-sample tests, etc.) and offer a free statistical toolset (Flocker 1.1).

== Literature ==
- Debout G 2003. Le corbeau freux (Corvus frugilegus) nicheur en Normandie: recensement 1999 & 2000. Cormoran, 13, 115–121.
- Jarman PJ 1974. The social organisation of antelope in relation to their ecology. Behaviour, 48, 215–268.
- Jovani R, Mavor R 2011. Group size versus individual group size frequency distributions: a nontrivial distinction. Animal Behaviour, 82, 1027–1036.
- Lengyel S, Tar J, Rozsa L 2012. Flock size measures of migrating Lesser White-fronted Geese Anser erythropus Acta Zoologica Academiae Scientiarum Hungaricae, 58, 297–303. (2012)
- Reiczigel J, Lang Z, Rózsa L, Tóthmérész B 2008. Measures of sociality: two different views of group size. Animal Behaviour, 75, 715–721.
- Reiczigel J, Mejía Salazar MF, Bollinger TK, Rozsa L 2015. Comparing radio-tracking and visual detection methods to quantify group size measures. European Journal of Ecology, 1(2), 1–4.

== See also ==
Size of groups, organizations, and communities

== Gallery ==
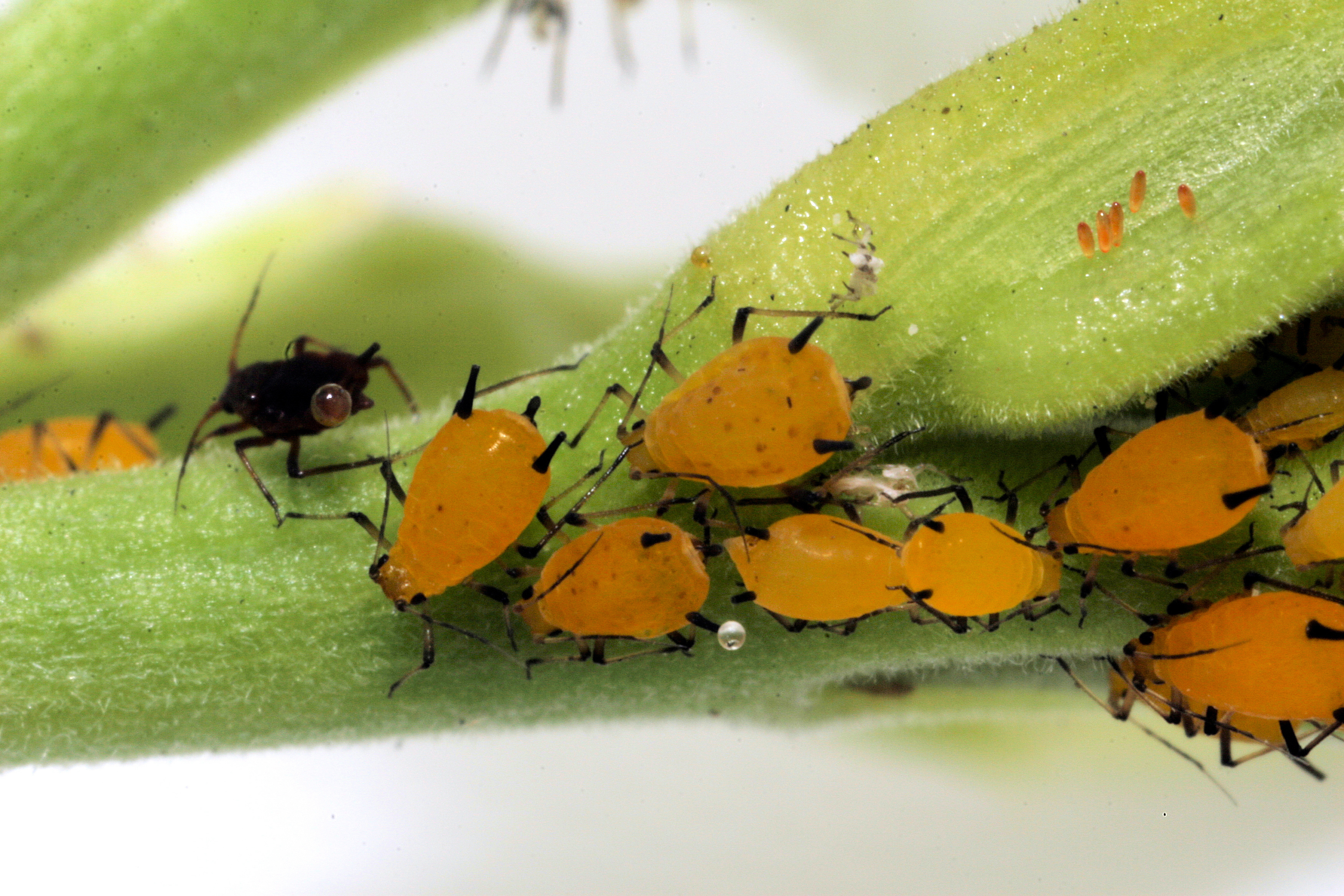
An aphid colony

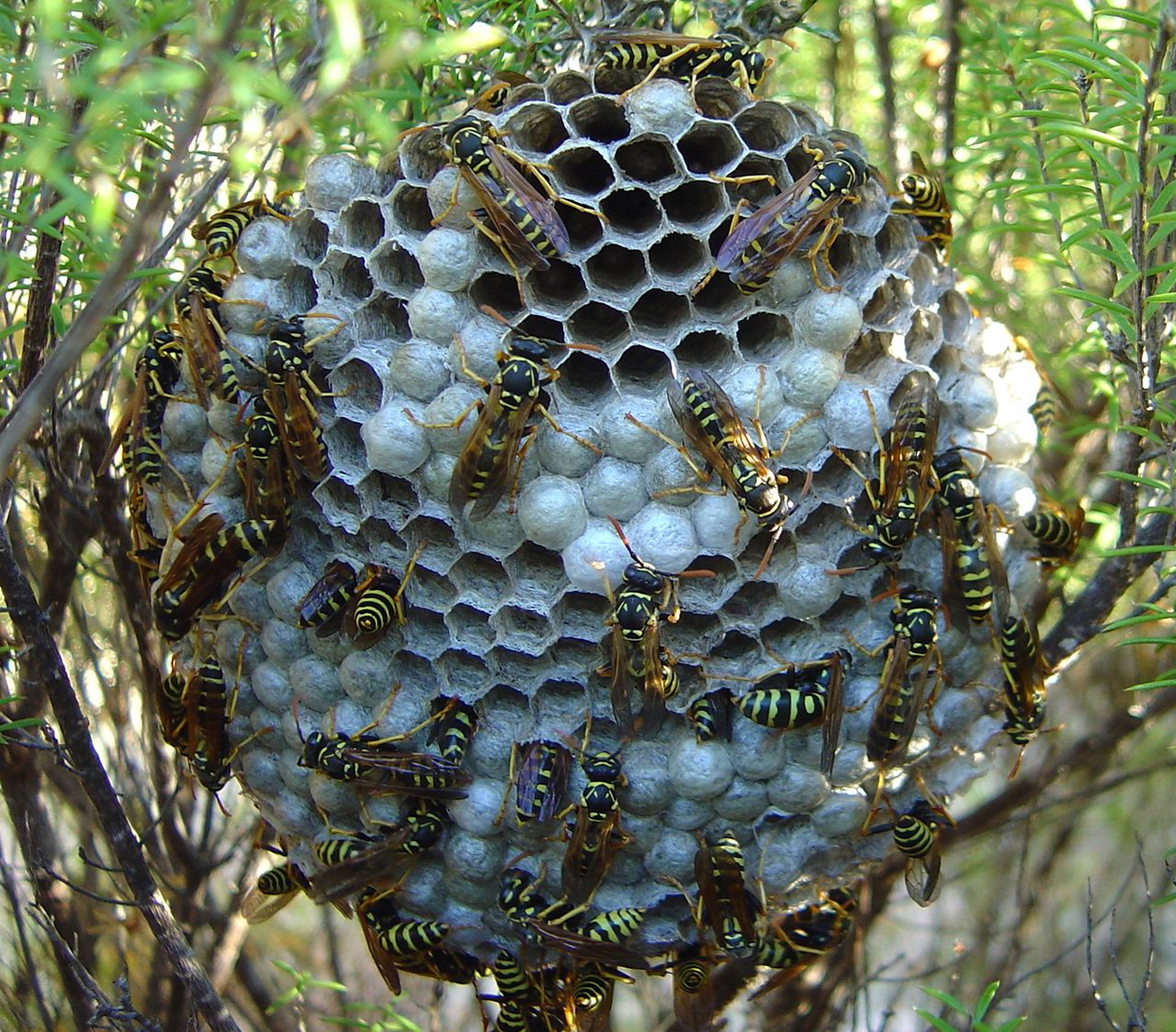
European paper wasp colony

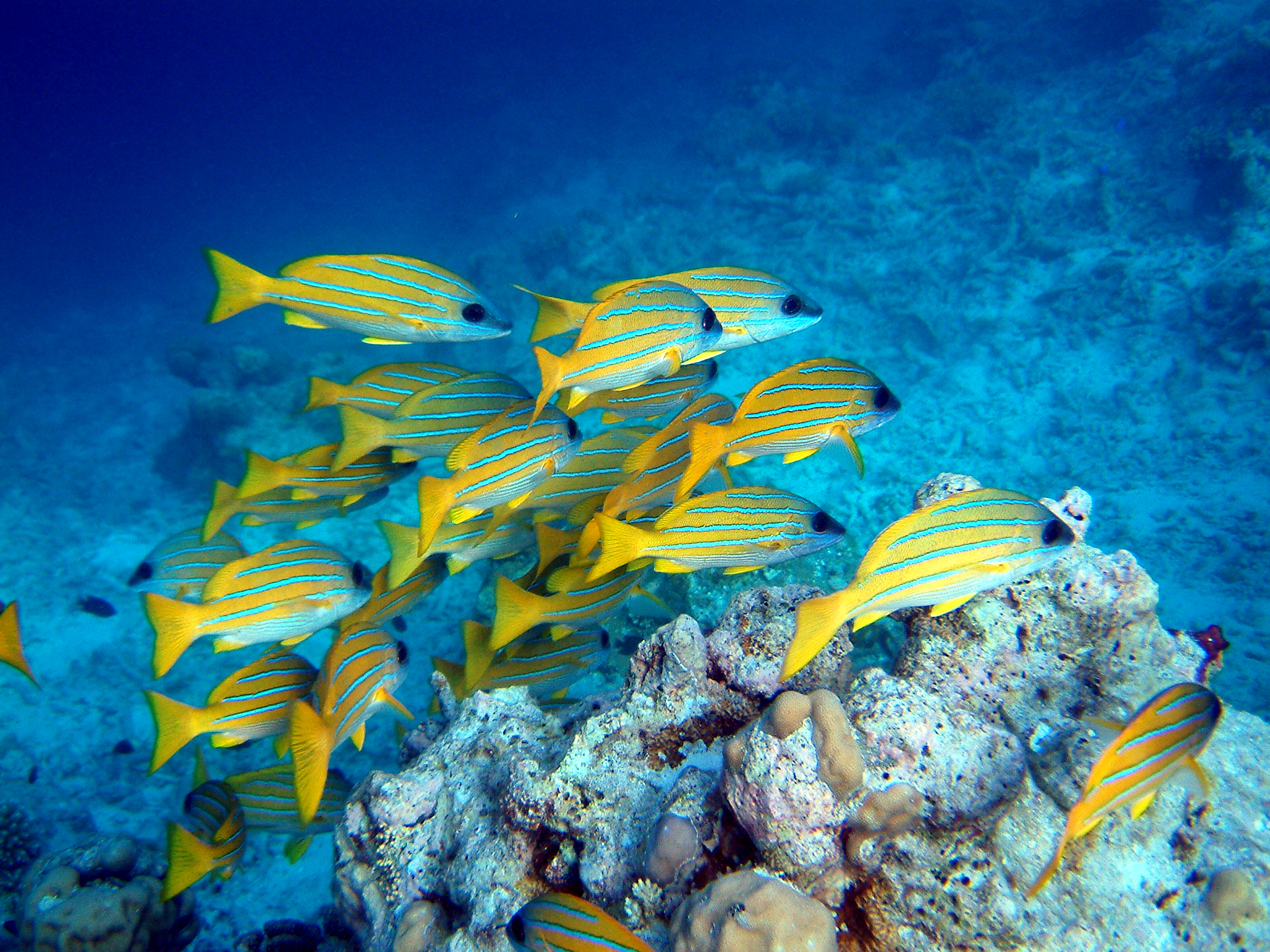
Bluestripe snapper schooling.

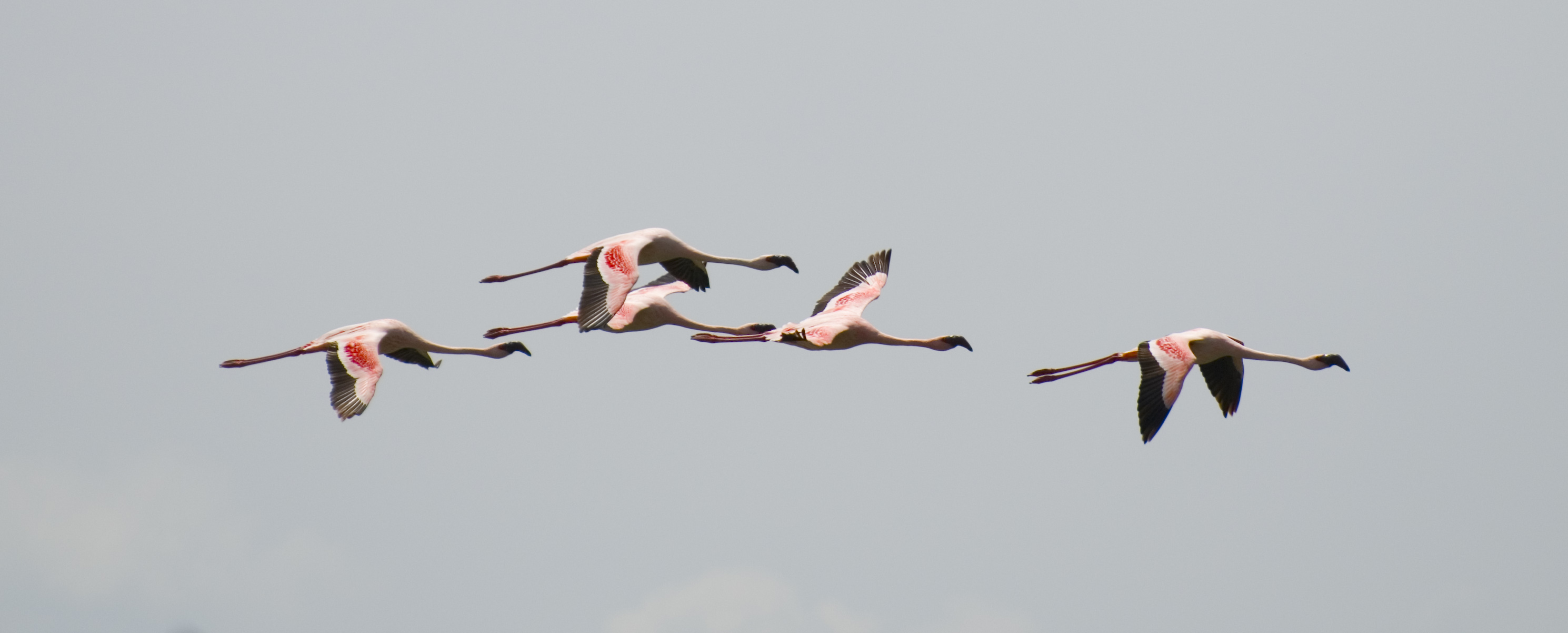
Flamingos

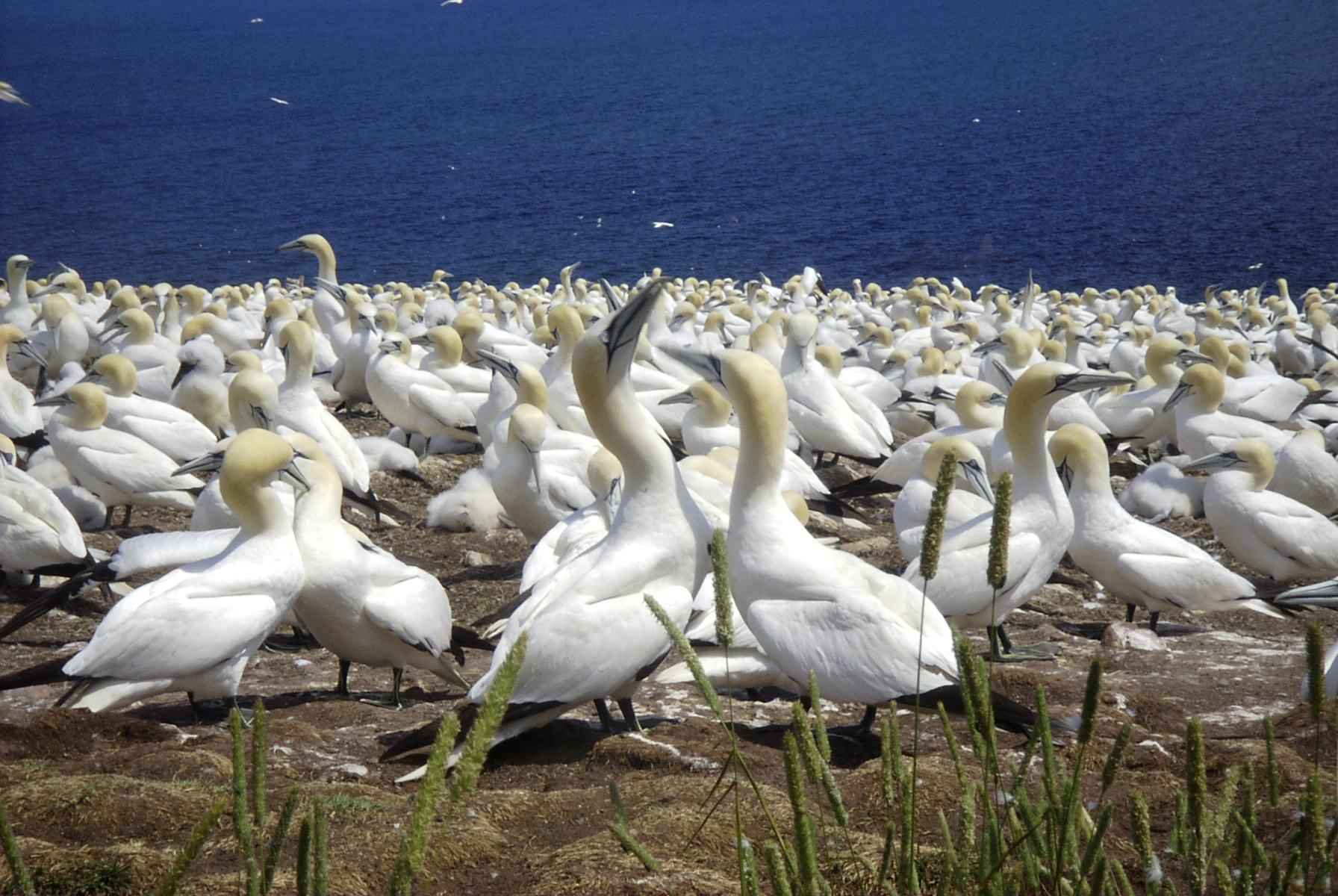
Gannet colony

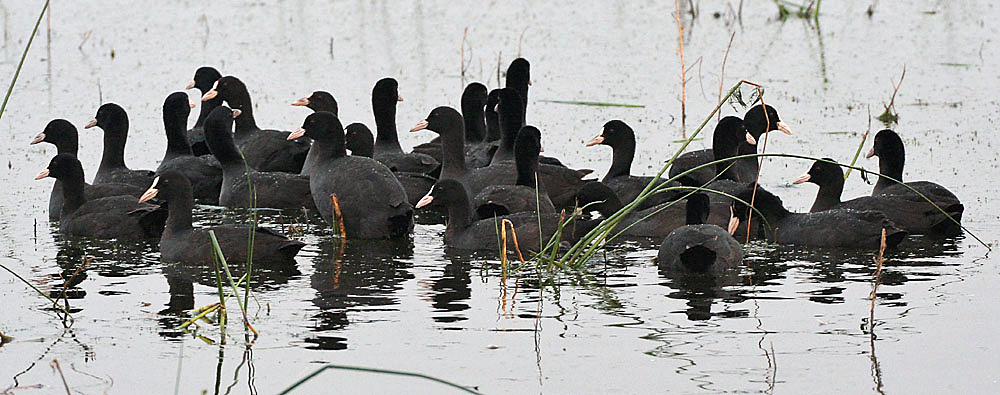
Common coots

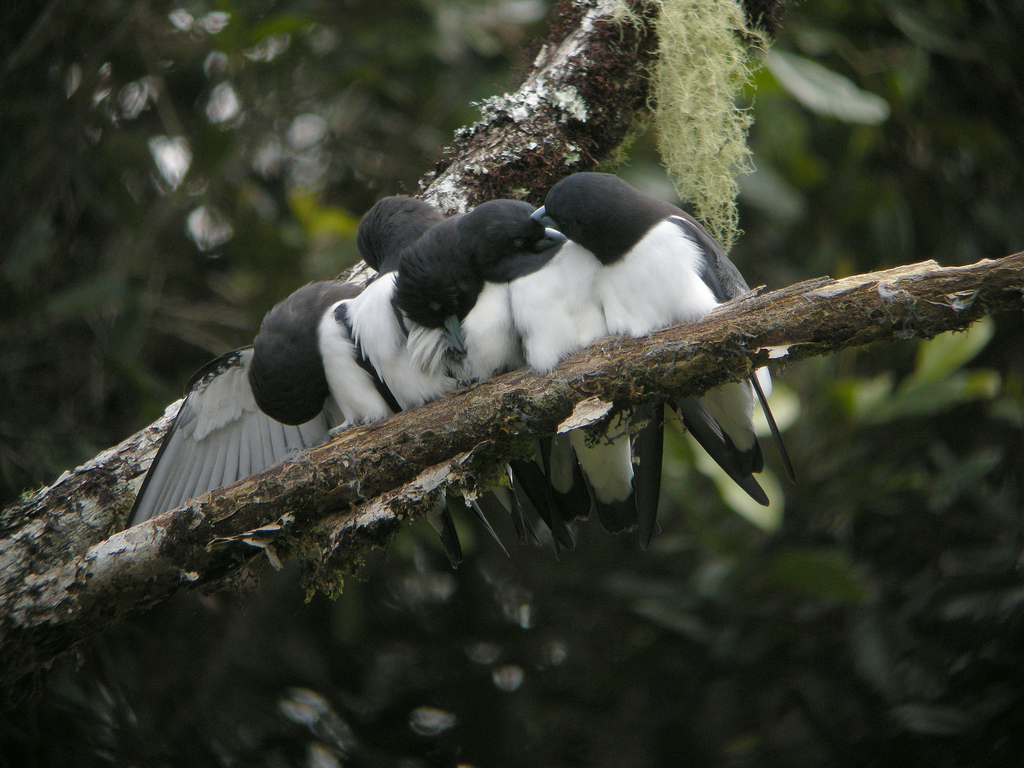
Great woodswallows allopreening.

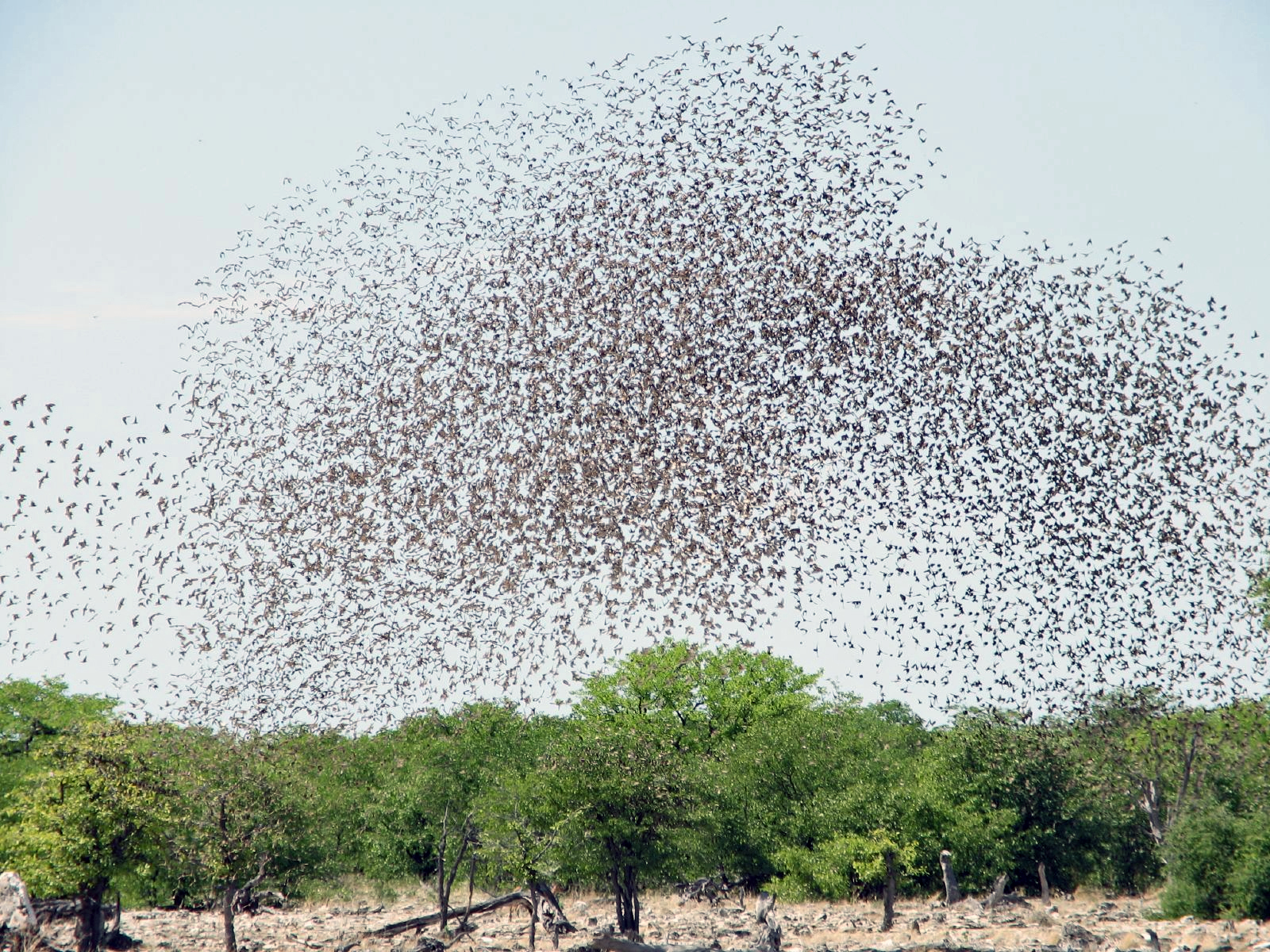
Red-billed quelea flock

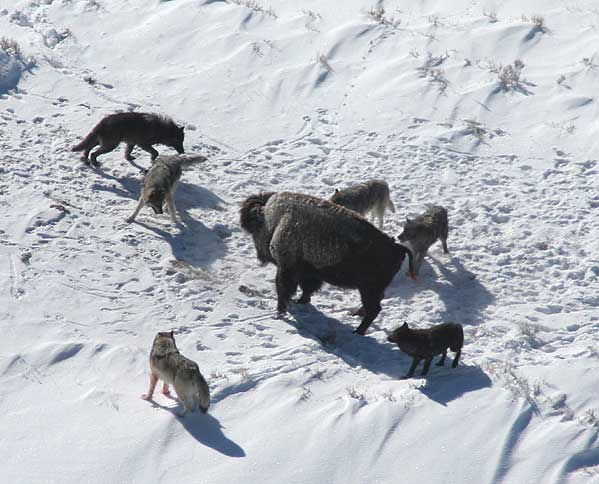
Wolf pack hunting

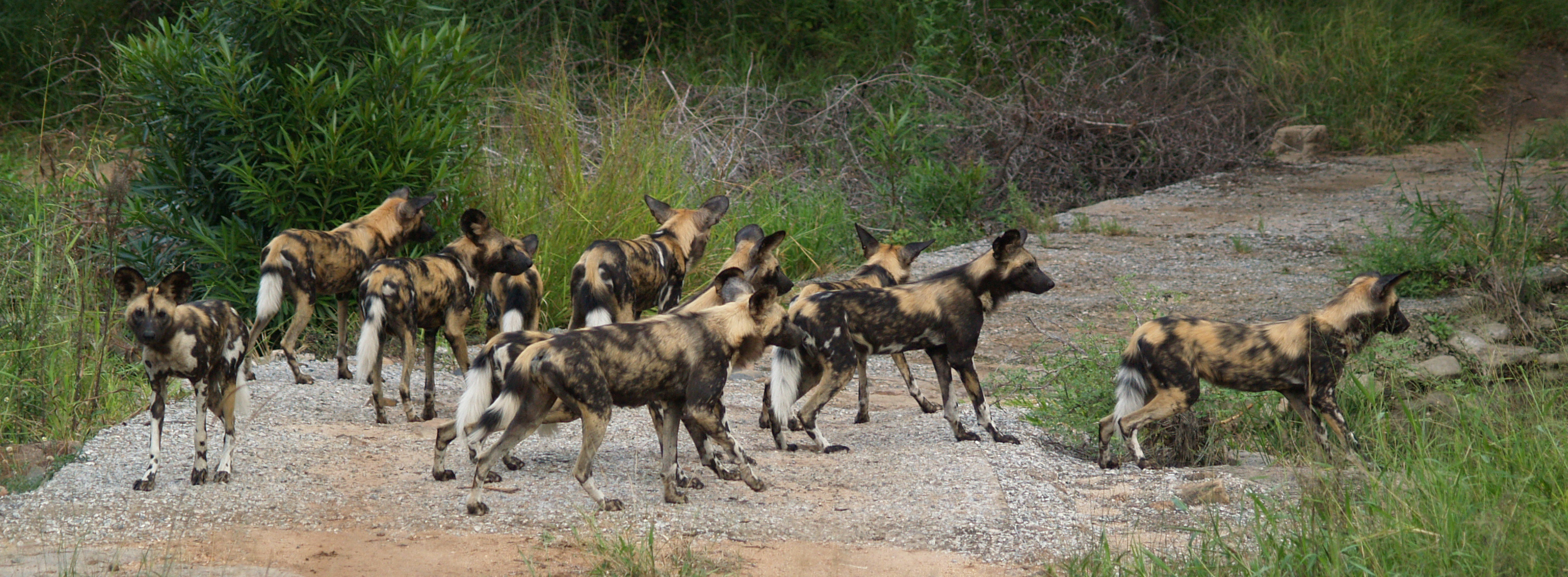
African wild dogs

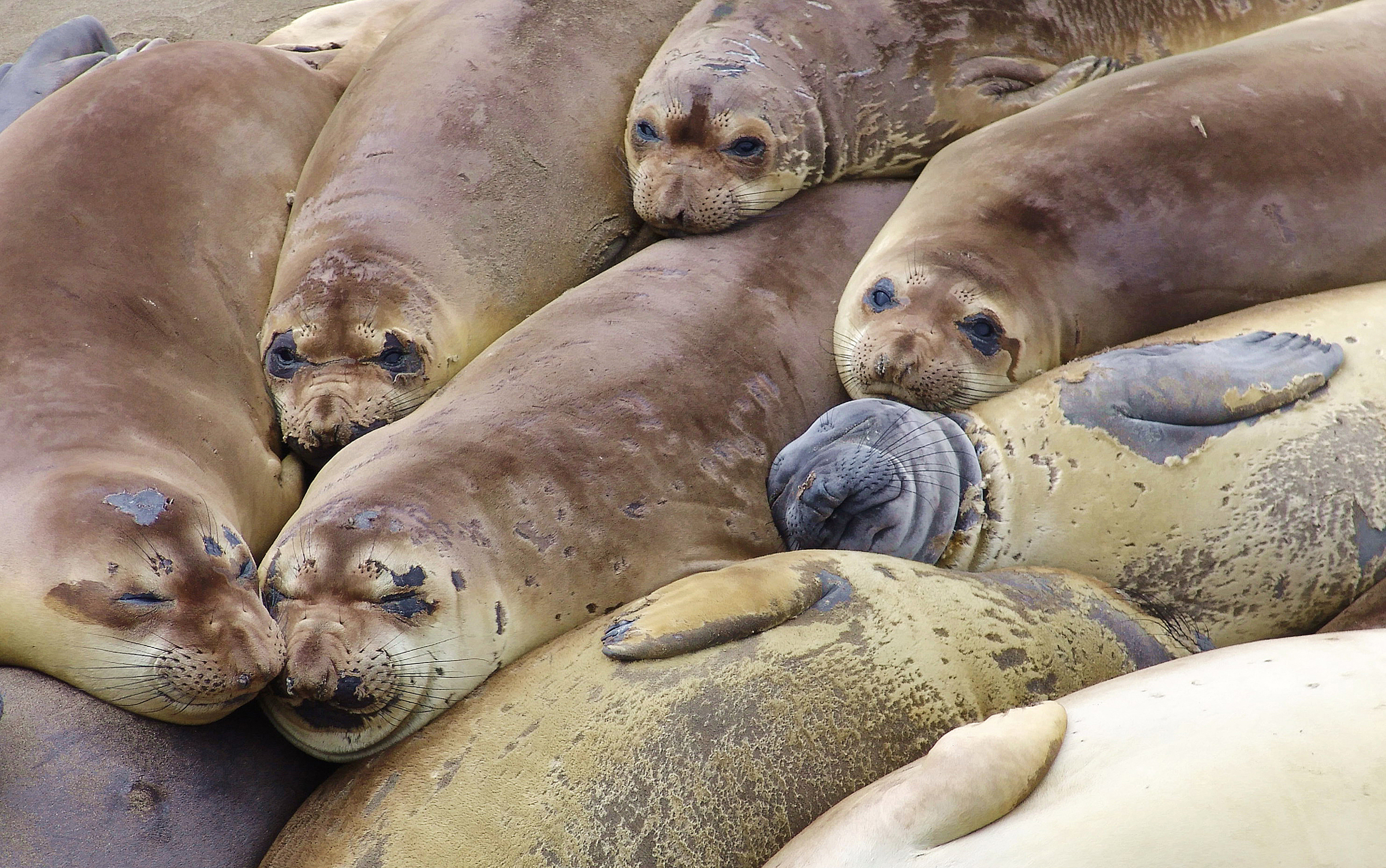
Elephant seals

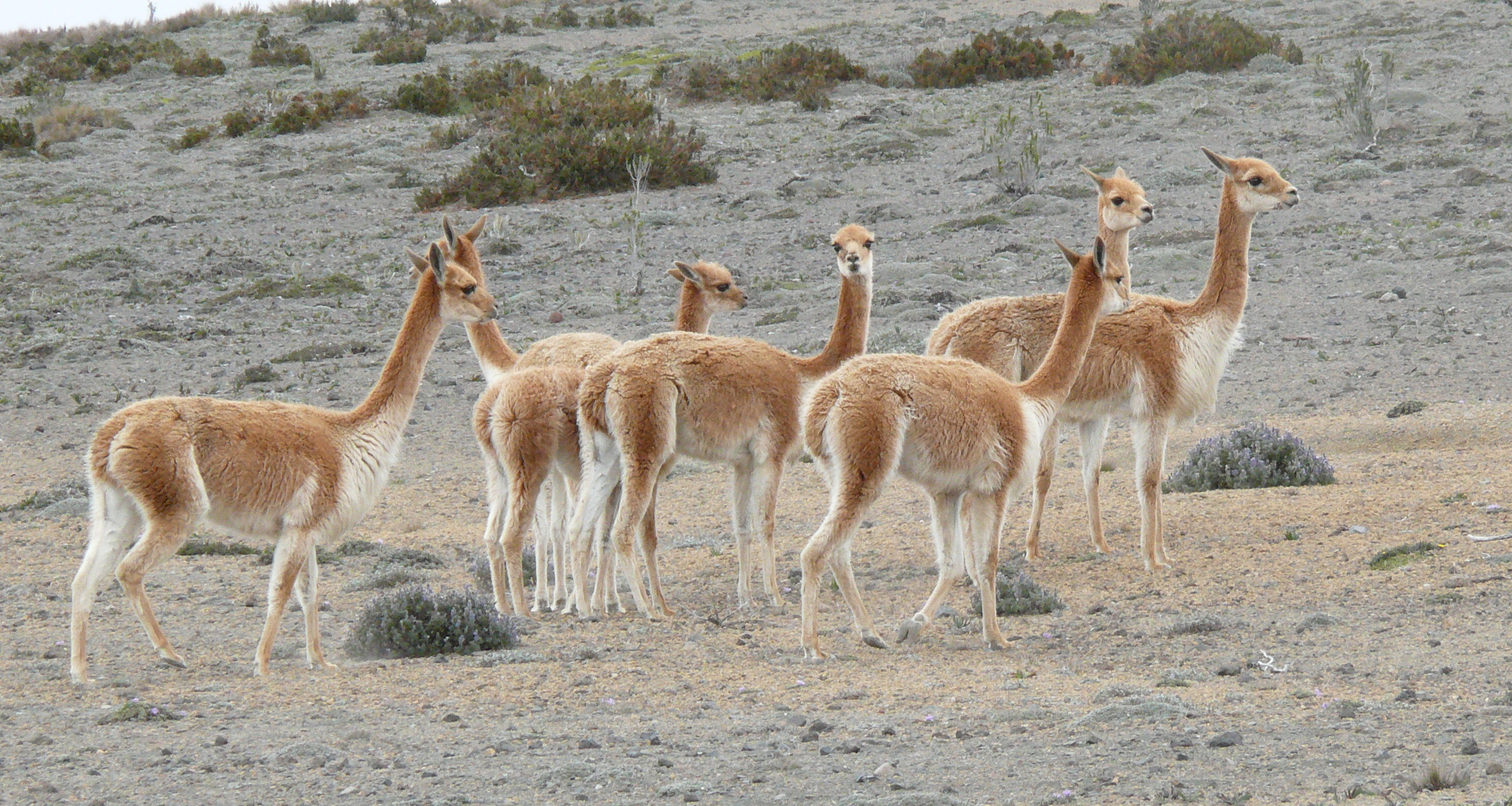
Vicuñas

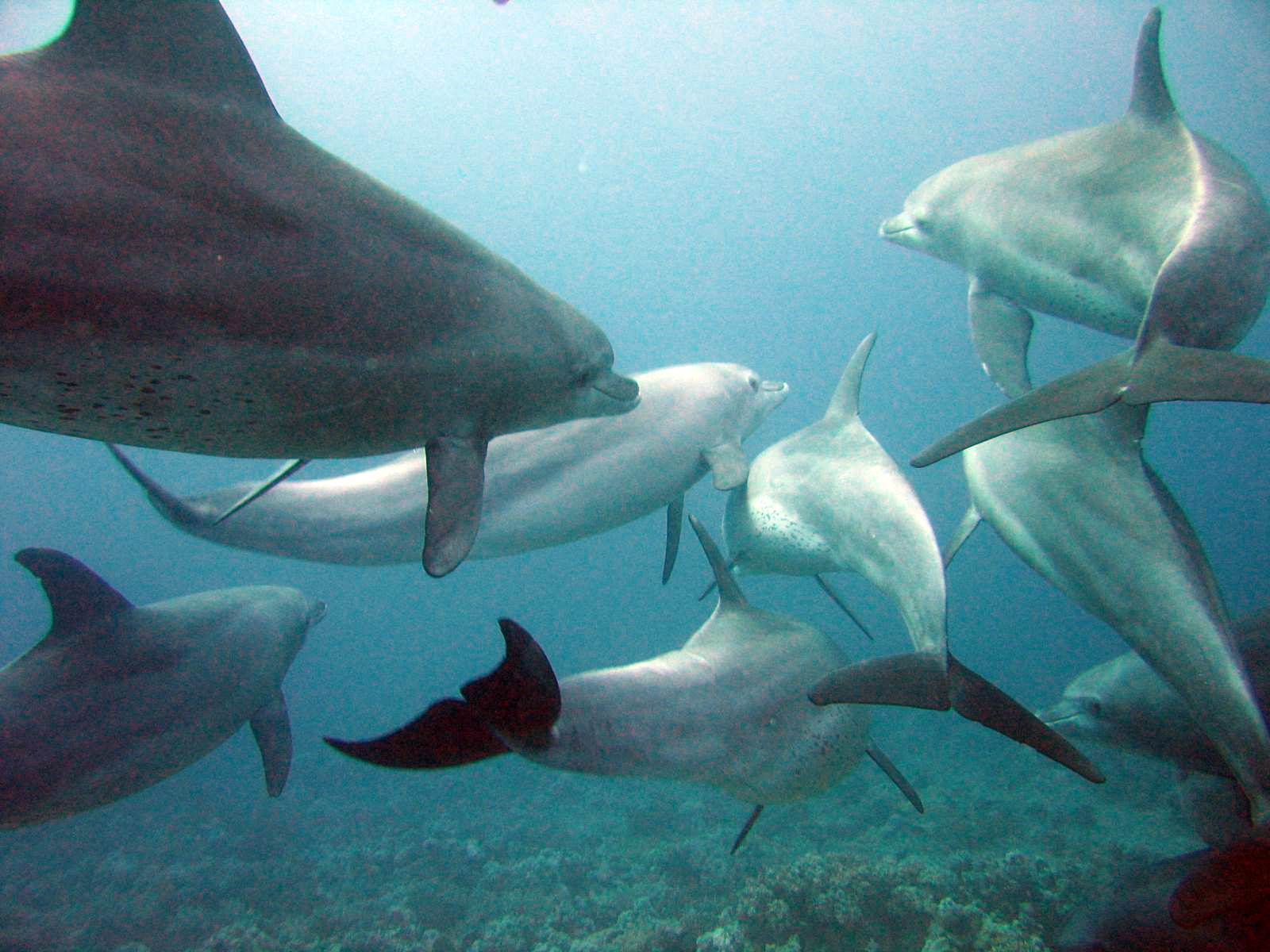
Bottlenose dolphins

African buffalo herd

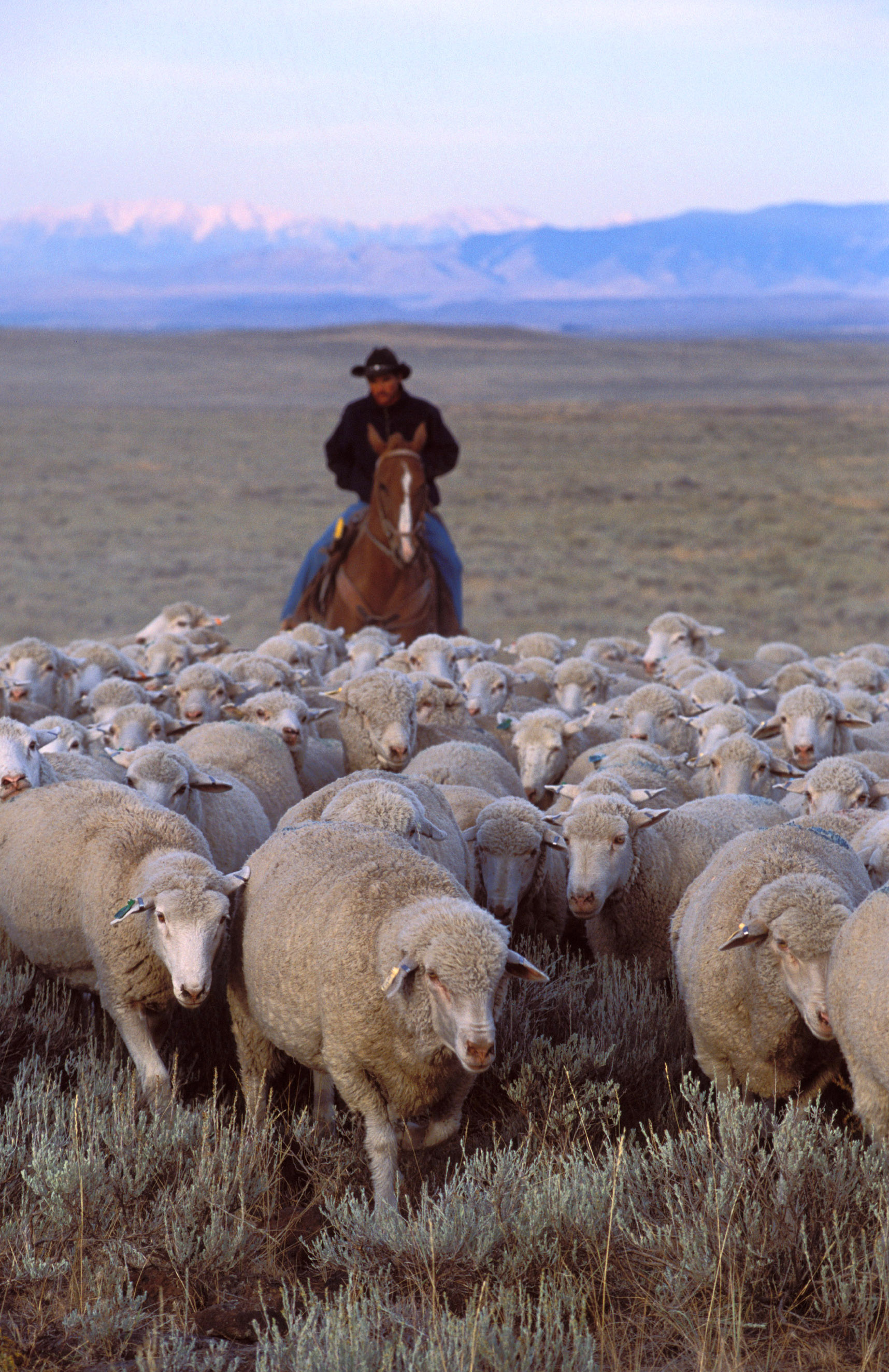
Sheep flock
