= University of Prešov =

University in Slovakia

- Slovak: Prešovská univerzita
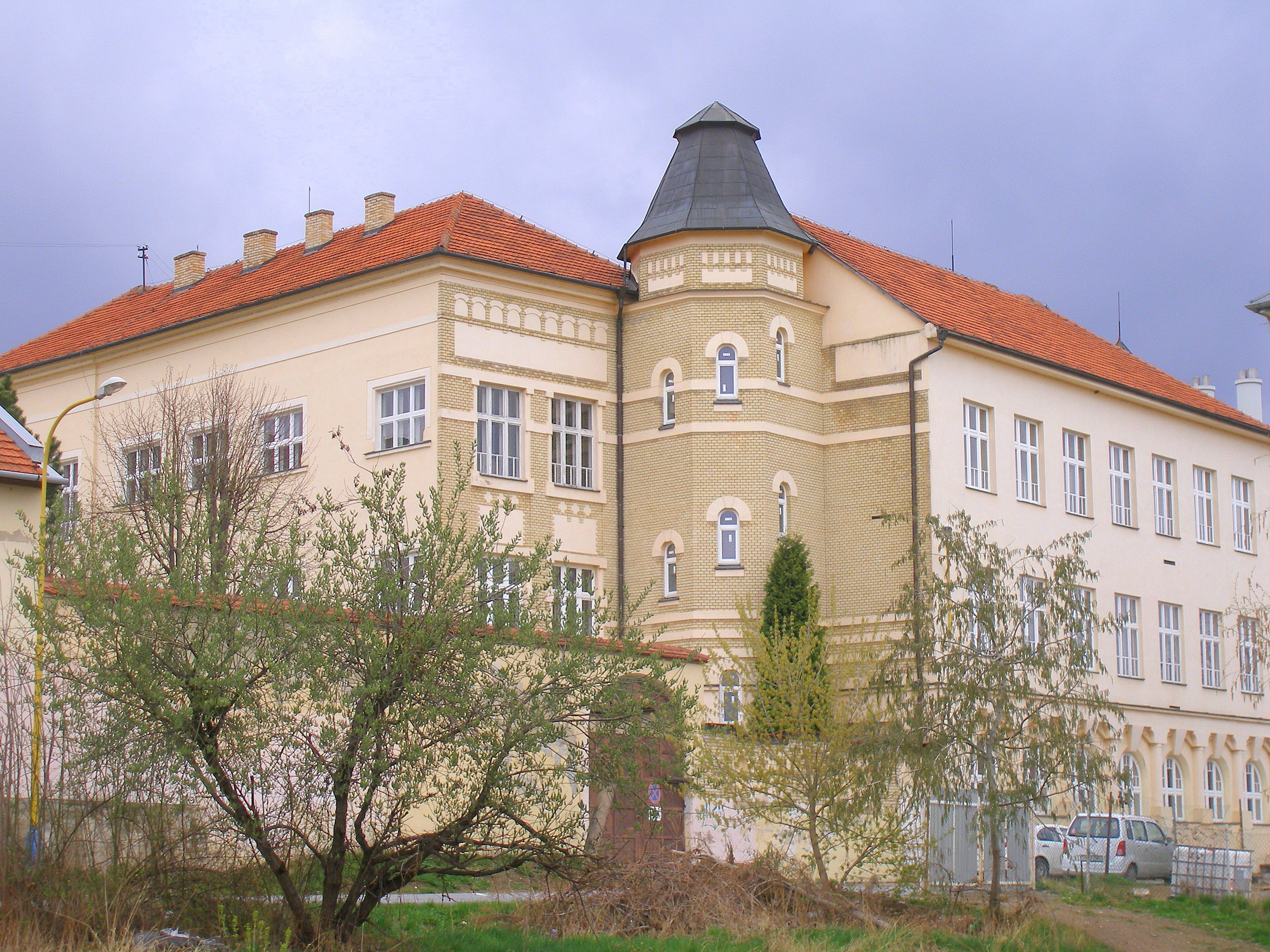
- Faculty of Greek-Catholic Theology
- Latin: Universitas Presoviensis
- Type: Public
- Established: 1997
- Affiliations: EUA, The American Chamber of Commerce in the Slovak Republic, Danube Rectors' Conference
- Rector: Dr. H.c. prof. PhDr. Peter Kónya PhD.
- Administrative staff: 1,050
- Students: 10,059 (as of 31 October 2012)
- Location: Námestie legionárov 3, 080 01, Prešov, Slovakia; 49°00′06″N 21°14′22″E
- Website: www.unipo.sk

The University of Prešov in Prešov (Slovak: Prešovská univerzita v Prešove) is the only public university in the Prešov Self-governing Region of Slovakia. It focuses on the areas of social, natural and theological sciences, sport, arts, management, and health care. It was established by law in December 1996 by splitting the University of Pavol Jozef Šafárik in Košice into the University of Pavol Jozef Šafárik in Košice and University of Prešov in Prešov. It was officially established on 1 January 1997. The outcomes of its active education and research programmes stretch significantly beyond the borders of Eastern Slovakia. Among its organizational units are three centres of excellence:

- Centre of Excellence in Lingual-Cultural Translation and Interpretation
- Centre of Excellence in Socio-Historical and Cultural-Historical Research
- Centre of Excellence in Animal and Human Ecology

Through bilateral agreements, the university cooperates with 75 higher education institutions from more than 20 countries, while Prešov students and teachers can spend time at one of more than 300 universities across Europe under the framework of the Erasmus programme. In addition, staff members present the results of their studies in articles that are published at home and abroad, as well as at various scientific events in countries such as Russia, South Africa, Singapore, Switzerland and the UK.

== Faculties ==
- Faculty of Arts (established in 1959)
- Faculty of Greek-Catholic Theology (established in 1990)
- Faculty of Humanities and Natural Sciences (established in 1997)
- Faculty of Management (established in 2004)
- Faculty of Education (established in 1949)
- Faculty of Orthodox Theology (established in 1950)
- Faculty of Sports (established in 2004)
- Faculty of Health Care (established in 2002)

== Journal ==
On behalf of the University of Prešov, De Gruyter publishes the European Journal of Ecology, an English-language, biannual journal that publishes original, peer-reviewed papers.
