= Stanley Park (Westfield, Massachusetts) =

Privately owned park in Massachusetts, US

Coordinates: 42°07′25″N 72°47′15″W

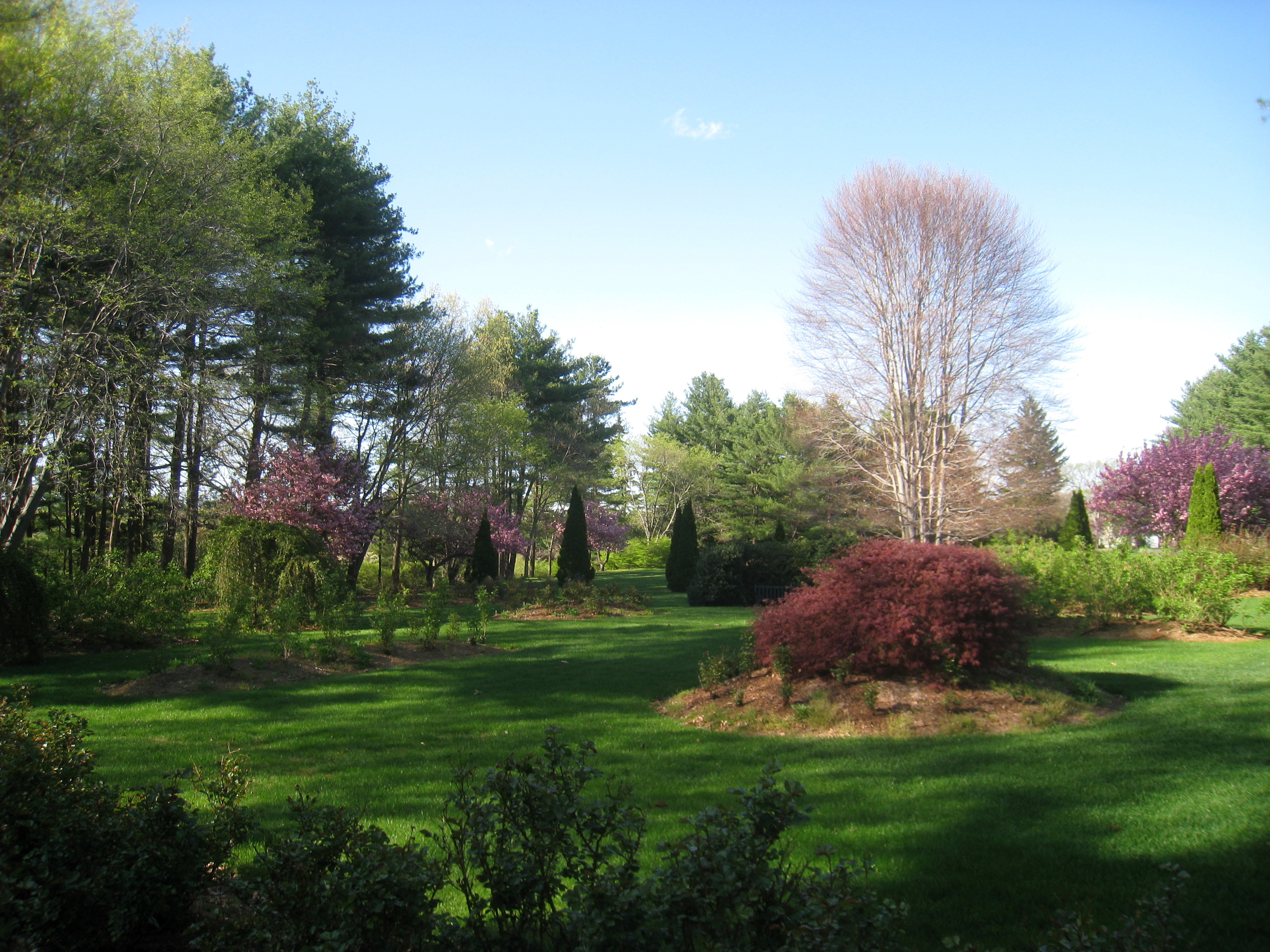
- One section of the 300 acre park.
- Interactive map of Stanley Park
- Website: Official website

Stanley Park is a non-profit privately owned park including an arboretum and botanical garden, located in Westfield, Massachusetts. It is open to the public daily without charge from May to November. Although the park is closed during the winter, people can still enter the park at their own risk. The duck pond area is monitored 24/7 with three security cameras, which are accessible on the park's websites.

Stanley Park was founded by Frank Stanley Beveridge in 1949. The park began on a 25-acre (100,000 m^{2}) plot, but now spans 300 acres (1.2 km^{2}) with multiple gardens, trails, and playing fields. It is a short walking distance from Westfield State University, located across Western Avenue to the northwest from Stanley Park.

== History ==
Frank Stanley Beveridge was born in Nova Scotia, Canada in 1879, and he moved to western Massachusetts in 1900 to attend Mount Hermon School in Northfield. After graduating, he traveled to New York where he married and began a family. He founded Stanley Home Products in Westfield, Massachusetts. and founded the Frank Stanley Beveridge Foundation in 1947, to both perform charitable works and to further his legacy. He founded Stanley Park in 1949, on 25 acres (100,000 m^{2}) of land at 400 Western Ave, Westfield. After he died in 1956, the foundation still honors his contributions to the community.

The security cameras at the duck pond were installed about 6 months after three teenagers killed a Muscovy duck in November 2011. Westfield Bank donated the security cameras, after public outcry that the park did not have any surveillance on the duck pond area. A memorial statue for the duck was also erected.

In 2017, a volunteer at the park created a memorial sign to be placed in sight of the life size bronze statue.

== Conservation ==
As of 2018, Stanley Park has prohibited the use of bread for feeding the park's ducks and geese. Stanley Park also has over 300 acres of protected woodland with miles of hiking trails.

== List of animals that live at the duck pond ==
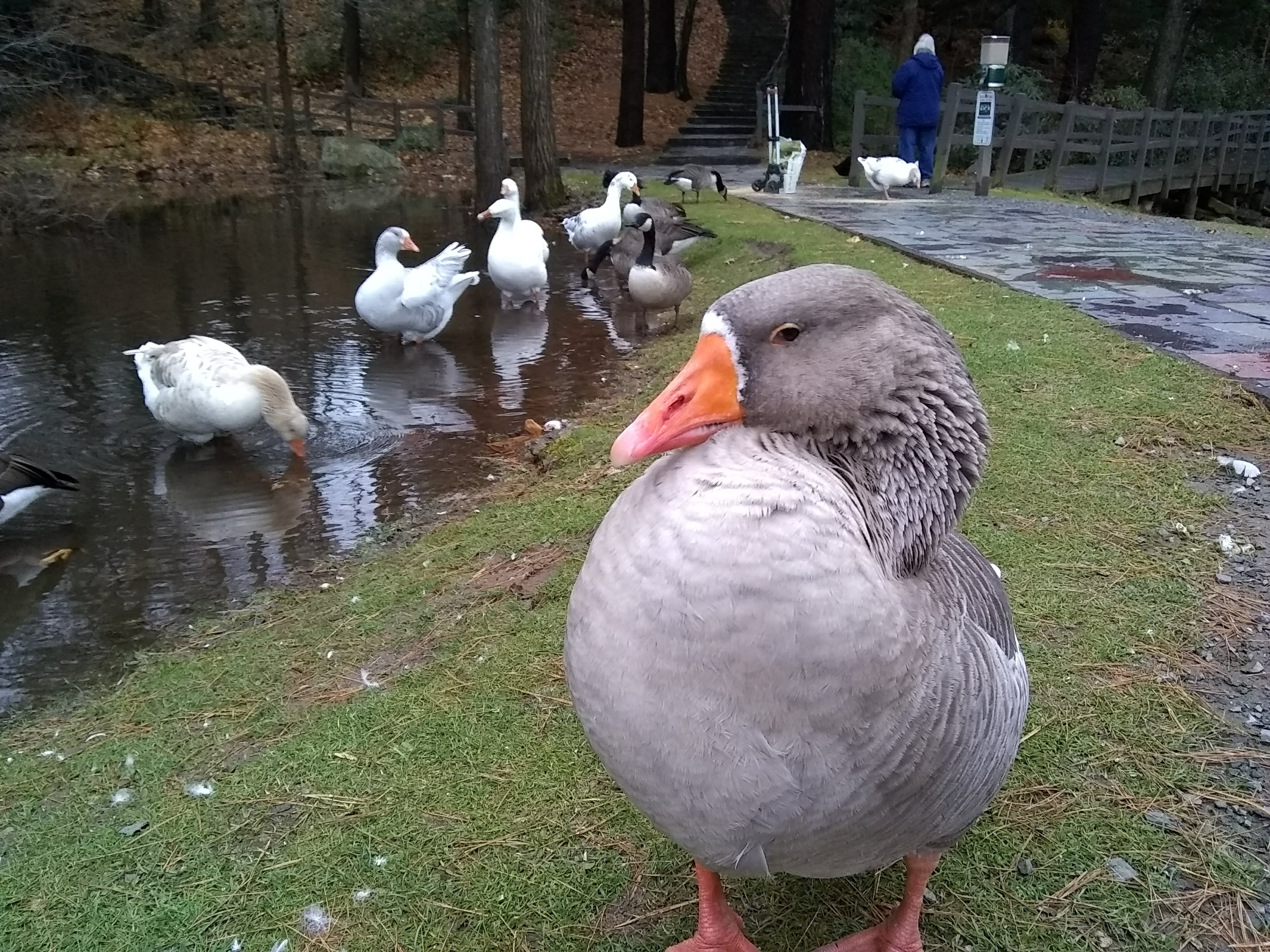
Greylag Goose

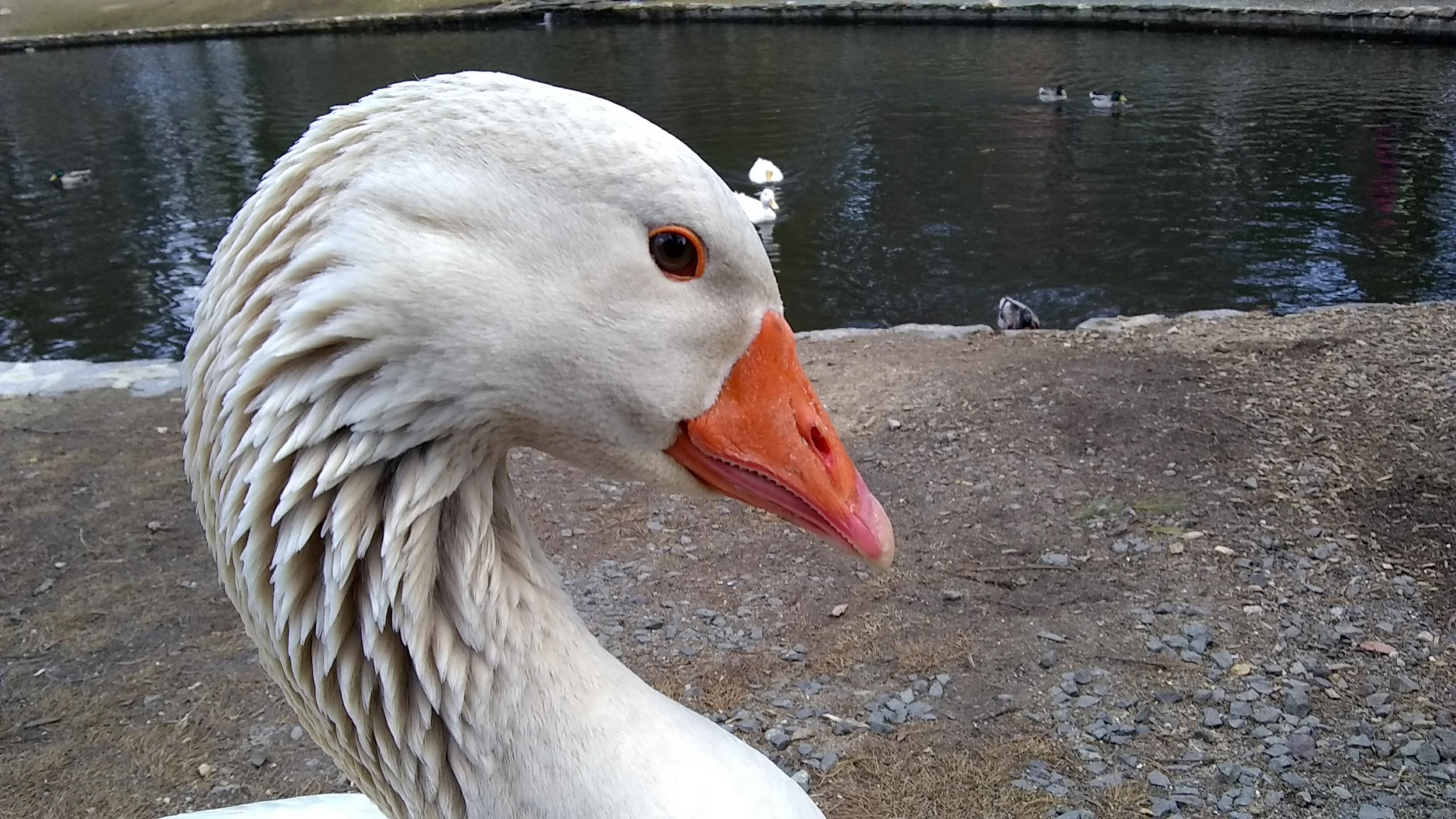
Goose at the duck pond

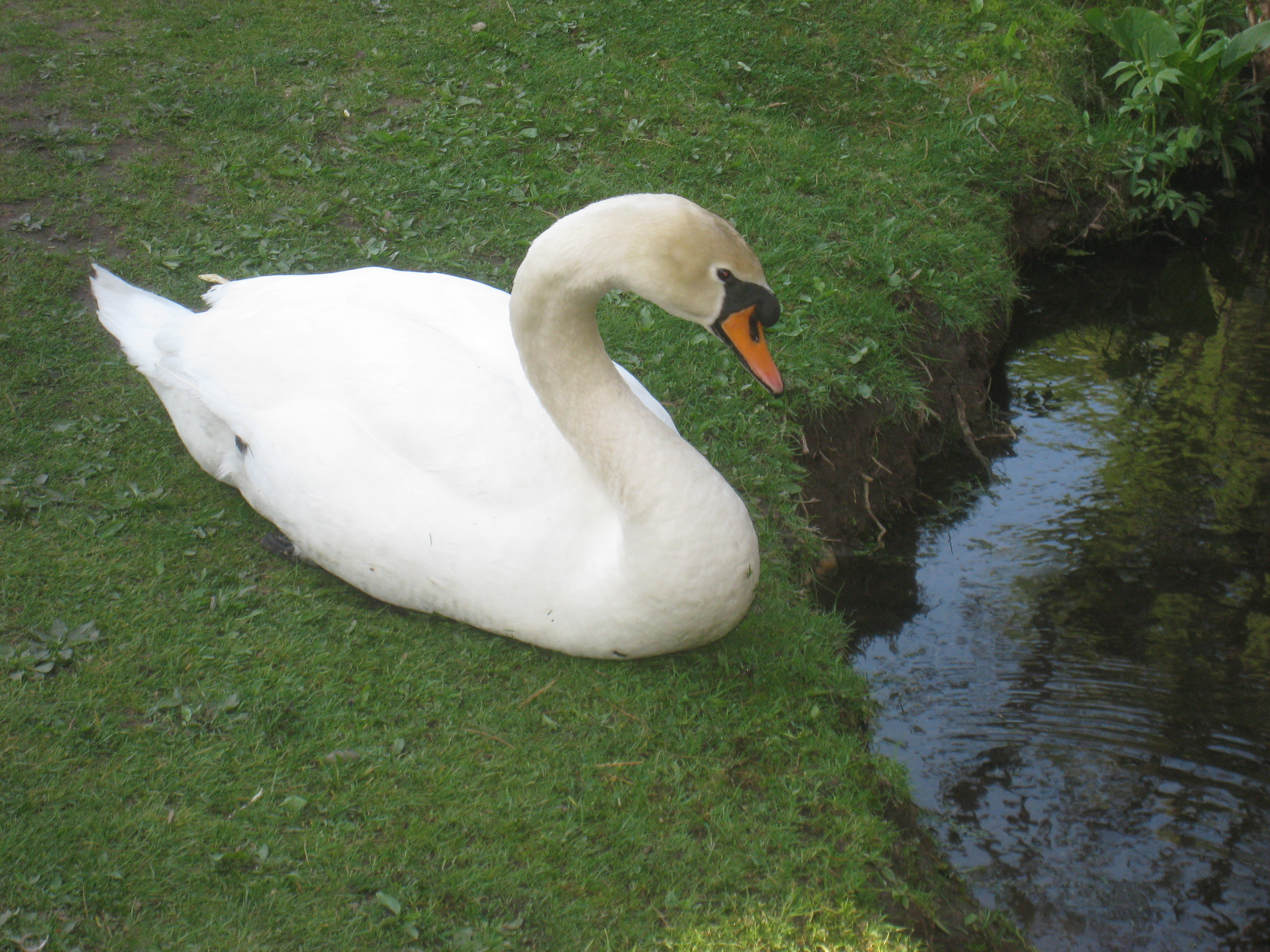
Stanley the Mute Swan

- American Black Ducks
- American Pekin Ducks
- Greylag Geese
- Brecon Buff Geese
- Snow Geese

Occasionally wood ducks will visit the pond in the winter, and in the summer some park guests have seen great blue herons.

A greylag goose lived in the pond until November 2, 2018 when he died. He was approximately 25 years old.

The park was established in 1945 by the philanthropist Frank Stanley Beveridge. It includes a number of gardens, listed below, as well as a playground, soccer fields, tennis courts, picnic area, wildlife sanctuary, colonial pond, covered bridge, and blacksmith shop.

- American Wildflower Society Display Garden - indigenous shade-tolerant New England wildflowers, with peak season in early May.
- Arboretum (≈ 6 acres) - trees and shrubs with a 30-foot (9.1 m) fountain.
- Bog garden
- Herb garden - fragrant, culinary, and medicinal herbs; mid-May through mid-October.
- Asian garden and teahouse - alpine conifers, rhododendrons, azaleas, and flowering deciduous shrubs with an authentic bamboo Japanese Tea House. Peak season mid-May through mid-June.
- Rhododendron Display Garden - hundreds of rare species, sponsored by the Massachusetts Chapter of the American Rhododendron Society, with peak season mid-May through early June.
- Rose Gardens - Over 50 varieties and 2,500 bushes. Winner of the "Outstanding Public Rose Garden" Award from All-America Rose Selections.

== General information ==
Stanley Park's hours of operation are from 7:00 am until nightfall every day. It is open beginning on the first Saturday in May and closes for the season on the last Sunday in November. The park is open to the public and does not charge for admission.

Stanley Park features multiple natural walking trails, throughout the woods and along the Little River, as well as leading to a variety of ponds, gardens, and wildlife sanctuary. Along with experiencing nature, Stanley Park features operating mills, a meetinghouse, blacksmith shop, Asian tea house, and dinosaur tracks. For recreation, the park has many playing fields, cross country course, a playground, and pavilions.

== Park attractions ==
=== Primary points of interest ===
- Arboretum - Approximately 5 acres (20,000 m^{2}) of land; many trees, shrubs, as well as a 30 ft (9.1 m) fountain
- Carillon Tower - 98 feet (30 m) high tower, inside there are 25 English bells, 61 Flemish carillon bells, an electric organ; tower has two bronze doors with 14 relief sculptures on them
- Colonial Pond - Many ducks and swans, two functioning mills: the Old Mill and Water Mill, and a quaint Covered Bridge
- Rose Garden - More than fifty roses species and 2,500 bushes
- Wildlife Sanctuary - 198 acres (0.80 km^{2}) of trails running beside Little River

=== Other attractions ===
Other attractions include:

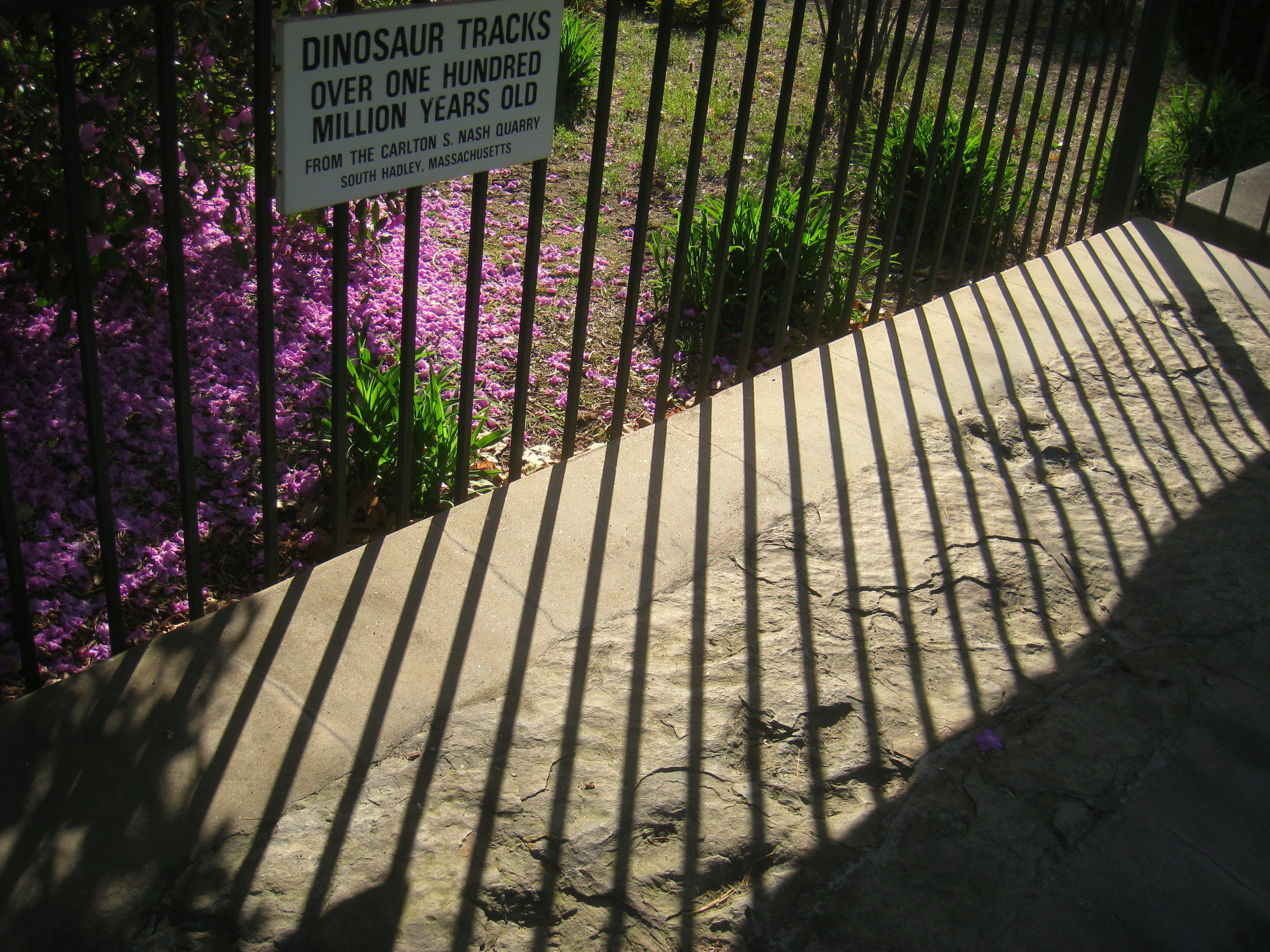
Dinosaur tracks

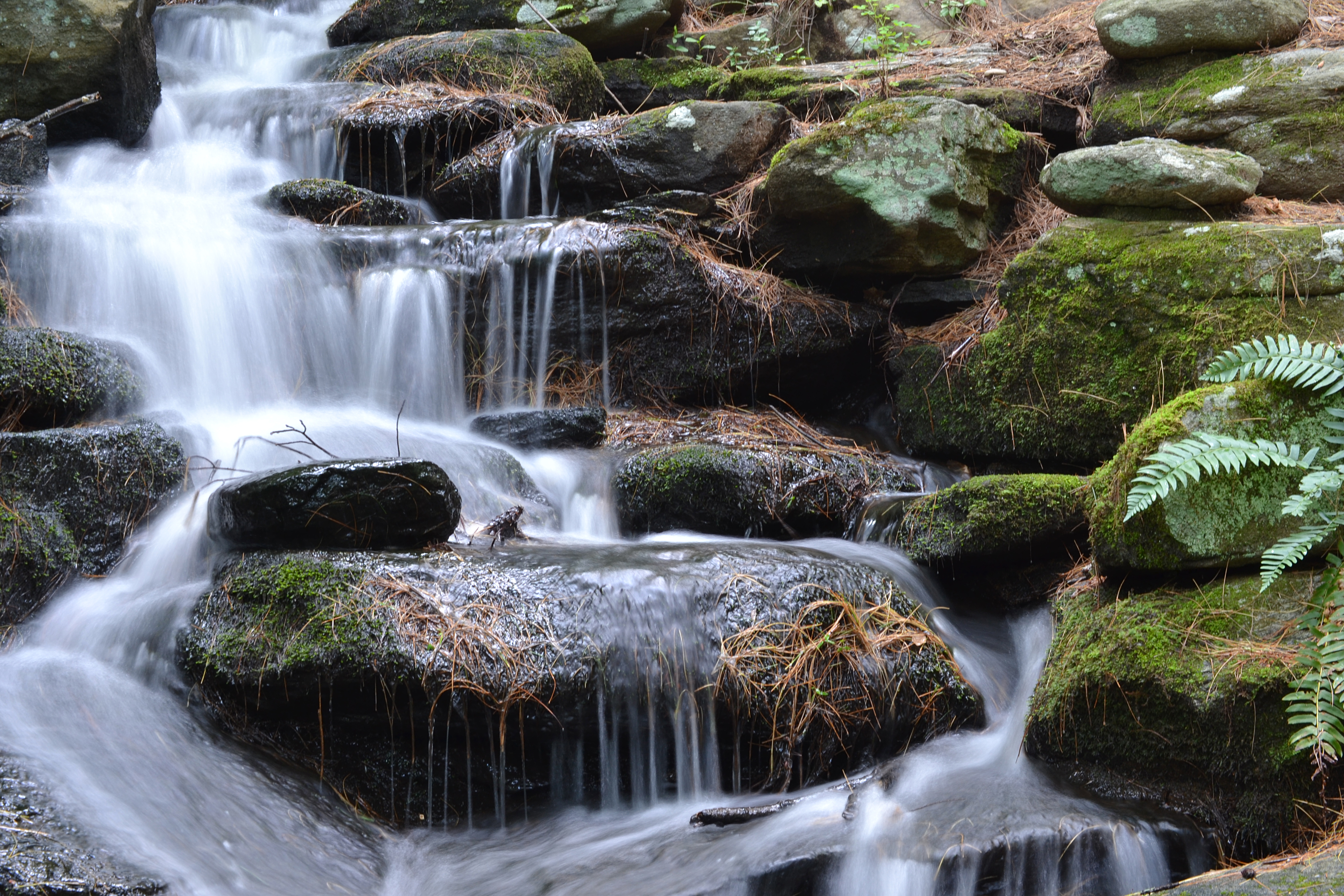
Waterfall

- ADA Playscape
- Angel Of Independence Statue
- Asian Garden/Tea House
- Basketball Courts
- Beveridge Pavilion
- Blacksmith Shop
- Carriage Shed
- Cathy’s Garden and Pavilion
- Cross Country Course
- Dinosaur Tracks
- Dorthy Perkins Garden
- Duck Pond
- Enchanted Oak
- Eternal Light, dedicated by Clare Boothe Luce
- Evelyn B. Rose Garden
- Frog Pond
- Herb Garden
- Lacrosse and Soccer Fields
- Meeting House
- Mill Shop
- Recreation Picnic Area
- Rhododendron Display Garden
- Shrine Area
- The Reeds
- Tennis Courts
- Woodland Wildflower Garden

== Events ==
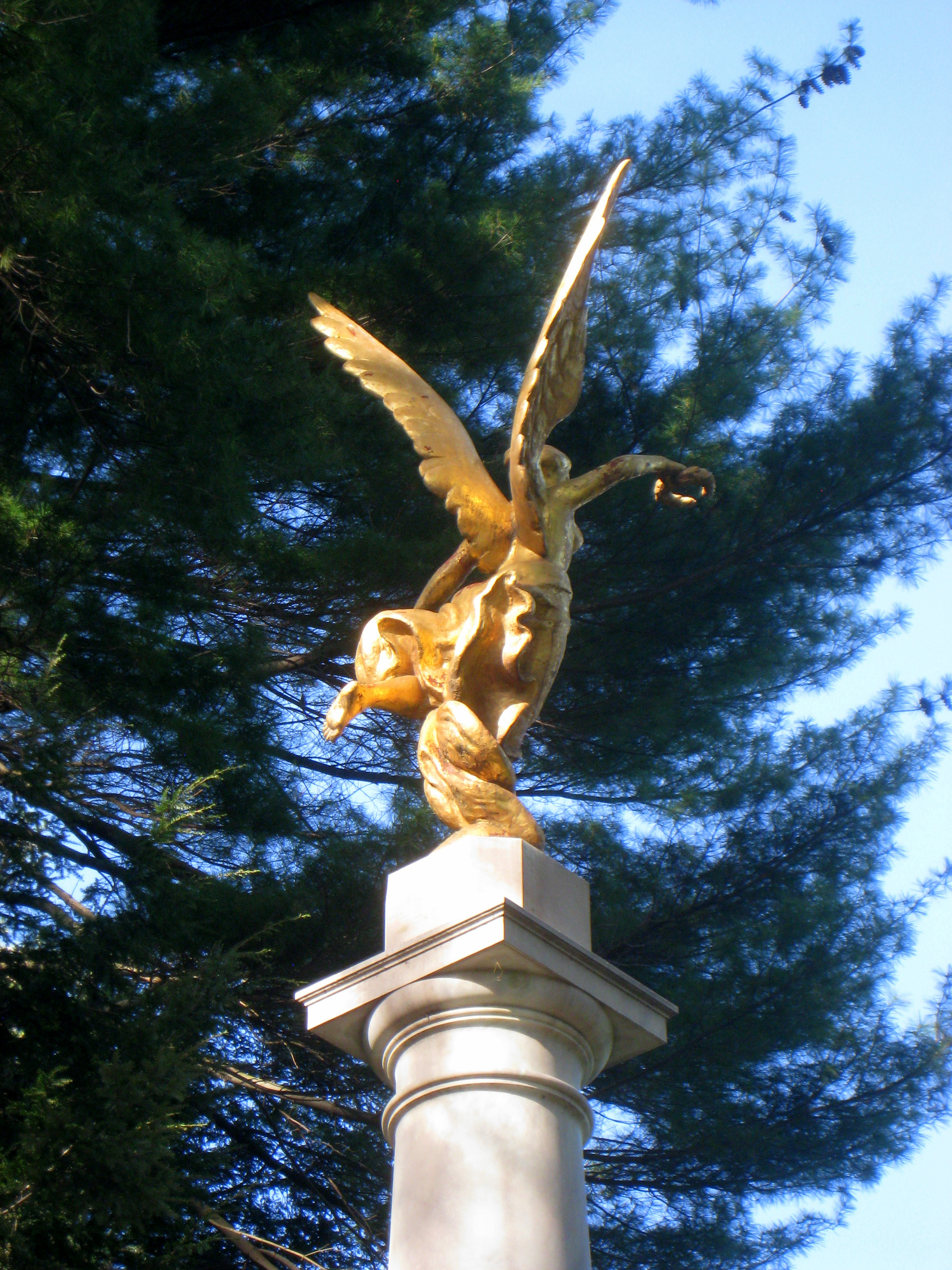
Angel Of Independence Statue

=== Carillon concerts ===
Stanley Park holds annual Carillon concerts every first and third Sunday each month. These concerts take place from May to November; beginning at 3:00 pm and ending at 4:00 pm.

=== Friday Mornings for Children ===
Stanley Park offers various children’s activities during the summer on Friday mornings. These include story telling, skits, and puppets.

=== Zoo on the Go ===
Stanley Park hosts a travelling zoo on three occasions during the summer. Children may pet and ask zookeepers questions about the animals during the event.

=== Wheel Walk ===
An annual Wheel Walk to promote accessibility at the park. Food and games provided.

== See also ==
- List of botanical gardens in the United States
