= Frank Stanley Beveridge =

- Born: March 17, 1879; Pembroke, Canada
- Died: December 4, 1956 (aged 77)
- Occupations: Businessperson and philanthropist

Frank Stanley Beveridge (April 17, 1879—December 4, 1956) was an businessman and philanthropist who was influential in the establishment of the direct selling business model.

Beveridge was born an orphan in Pembroke Canada on April 17, 1879. He was adopted by Joseph and Hannah Beveridge and grew up in Nova Scotia.

== Education and Early Work in Sales ==
He moved to Western Massachusetts to study at Northfield Mount Hermon School, founded by the influential evangelical preacher Dwight L. Moody. The first chapter about Moody's career in Northfield describes Beveridge's journey from Nova Scotia to Northfield and his eventual emergence as a "typical" Mount Hermon student.

According to an interview with Stanhome CEO Homer Perkins, Beveridge stayed at Mount Hermon for two years, and then turned to sales. Beveridge's first sale took places in rural Hawley, Pennsylvania, where he sold an Irish washerwoman a stereoscope with images of the Vatican. The stereoscopes were produced by Underwood & Underwood.

Beveridge sold products from the Fuller Brush Company in Upstate New York. The director of the Fuller Brush Company, Alfred Fuller, happened to also hail from Nova Scotia, and Fuller ultimately offered Beveridge a position as Director of Sales. Around this time he married Theresa Burdick (12 Sep 1875–7 Jan 1968)

== Stanley Home Products and the Party Plan ==
On August 15, 1931, Beveridge founded the Stanley Home Products Company, Incorporated. The company owed much of its success to what became known as Party plan method of direct selling, created by Beveridge and Catherine L. O'Brien. It would go on to be a key component of the success of the Tupperware, Avon, and Mary Kay brands.

The company moved through several bases of operations as its production grew; its final location was a large mill in Easthampton, Massachusetts. A company advertisement from 1954 listed their products as "Mops, Brushes, Brooms, Dusters, Waxes, Polishes, Cleaning Chemicals, Deodorizers, Moth Preventives, …Feminine Toilette Articles, Masculine Shaving Preparations, Bath Accessories, Personal and Clothing Brushes, Dental Hygiene Aids, a wealth of other items to improve personal grooming."

A 1954 advertisement promoting rewards for Stanley Party Hostesses

The company remained a major employer in Easthampton until its closure in 1996.

== Philanthropy ==
=== The Beveridge Family Foundation ===
In 2008 various trusts established by Beveridge were combined into one. The trust grants scholarships to various educational institutions, non-governmental organizations, and other endeavors in Hampden and Hampshire Counties, Massachusetts.

=== Stanley Park ===
He founded the 300-acre Stanley Park in Westfield, Massachusetts in 1949.

The existence of populations of black squirrels in Western Massachusetts are attributed to an initial population given as a gift from Hubert L. Worell and Alvah (Al) Elzerman to Beveridge. Black squirrels were released in Stanley Park and have spread in the Pioneer Valley.

Stanley Park of Westfield
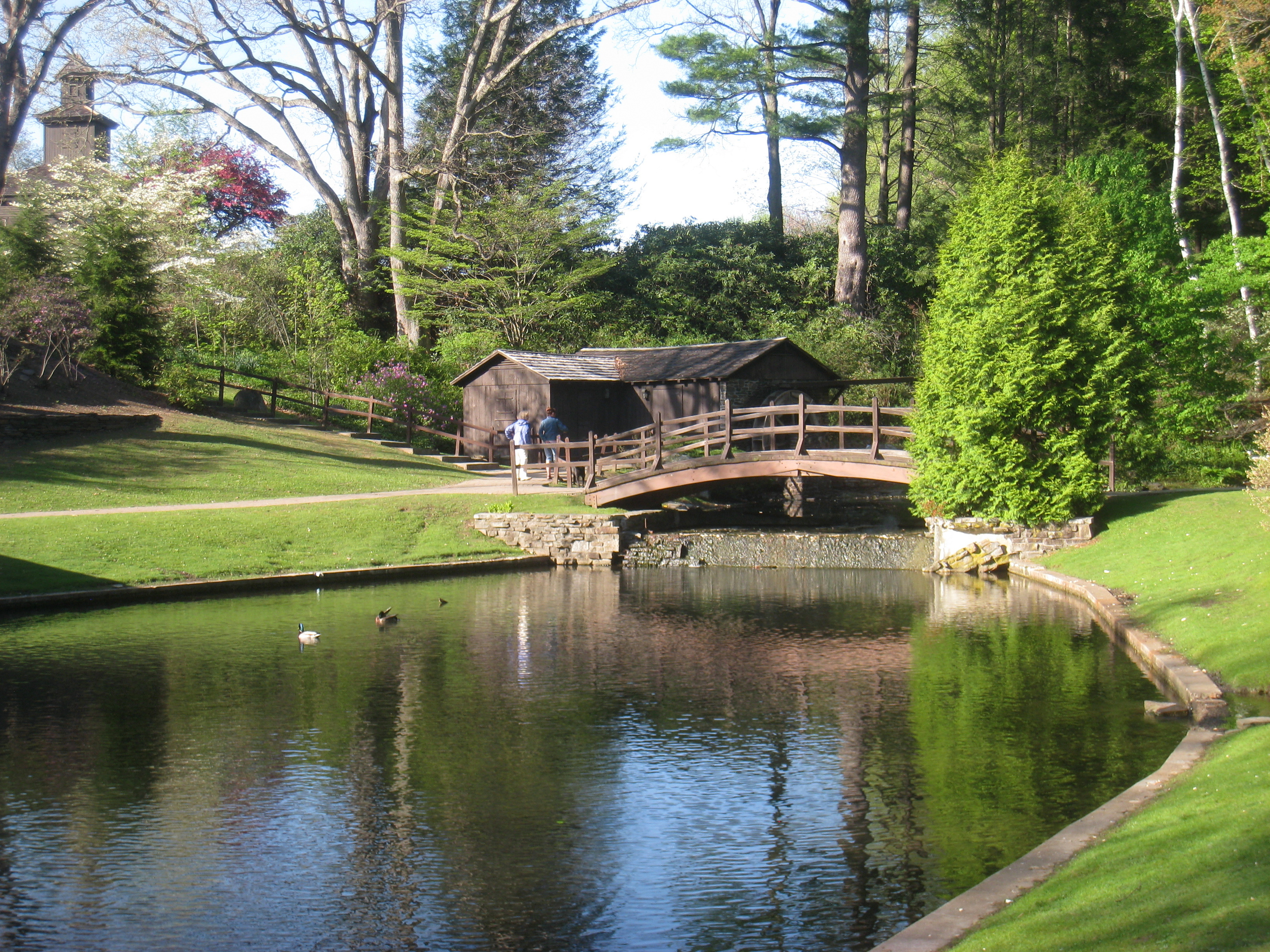
Footbridge

Gazebos

Meeting House

Entrance to the Frank Stanley Beveridge Memorial Wildlife Sanctuary

== Legacy ==
Multiple buildings, scholarships, and parks are named for Beveridge. Beveridge Hall, a classroom building which was completed in 1952 at Northfield Mount Hermon School, is named for Beveridge, as is the Frank Stanley Beveridge Award. The Beveridge Center at Springfield College was also named for him.

Historical photo of Beveridge Hall at Mount Hermon

Contemporary photo of Beveridge Hall at Mount Hermon
