= European Journal of Ecology =

- Discipline: ecology
- Language: English
- Edited by: Piotr Tryjanowski

Publication details
- History: 2015–present
- Publisher: University of Kansas Libraries, on behalf of the University of Presov (Slovakia, European Union)
- Frequency: biannual
- Open access: yes

Standard abbreviations
- ISO 4: Eur. J. Ecol.

Indexing
- ISSN: 1339-8474

Links
- Journal homepage

The European Journal of Ecology is an English-language, biannual, scientific journal founded in 2015. It publishes original, peer-reviewed papers (in categories like research articles, reviews, forum articles, policy directions) referring to any branches of ecology. All articles are open access for readers and authors are also free from any publication fees or page charges.

The journal provides a fair publication forum not only for experienced scientists, but also for beginners. Therefore, free language-correction services are provided for authors from non-English speaking regions. Reviewers are required to provide helpful and detailed advice, comments, and constructive criticism.
