= Dunbar's number =

Suggested cognitive limit important in sociology and anthropology

Dunbar's number is a suggested cognitive limit to the number of people with whom one can maintain stable social relationships—relationships in which an individual knows who each person is and how each person relates to every other person. This number was first proposed in the 1990s by Robin Dunbar, a British anthropologist who found a correlation between primate brain size and average social group size. By using the average human brain size and extrapolating from the results of primates, he proposed that humans can comfortably maintain 150 stable relationships. There is some evidence that brain structure predicts the number of friends one has, though causality remains to be seen.

Dunbar explained the principle informally as "the number of people you would not feel embarrassed about joining uninvited for a drink if you happened to bump into them in a bar." Dunbar theorised that "this limit is a direct function of relative neocortex size, and that this, in turn, limits group size ... the limit imposed by neocortical processing capacity is simply on the number of individuals with whom a stable inter-personal relationship can be maintained". On the periphery, the number also includes past colleagues, such as high school friends, with whom a person would want to reacquaint themselves if they met again. Proponents assert that numbers larger than this generally require more restrictive rules, laws, and enforced norms to maintain a stable, cohesive group. It has been proposed to lie between 100 and 250, with a commonly used value of 150.

== Research background ==
Primatologists have noted that, owing to their highly social nature, primates must maintain personal contact with the other members of their social group, usually through social grooming. Such social groups function as protective cliques within the physical groups in which the primates live. The number of social group members a primate can track appears to be limited by the volume of the neocortex. This suggests that there is a species-specific index of the social group size, computable from the species' mean neocortical volume.

In 1992, Dunbar used the correlation observed for non-human primates to predict a social group size for humans. Using a regression equation on data for 38 primate genera, Dunbar predicted a human "mean group size" of 148 (casually rounded to 150), a result he considered exploratory because of the large error measure (a 95% confidence interval of 100 to 230).

Dunbar then compared this prediction with observable group sizes for humans. Beginning with the assumption that the current mean size of the human neocortex had developed about 250,000 years ago, during the Pleistocene, Dunbar searched the anthropological and ethnographical literature for census-like group size information for various hunter–gatherer societies, the closest existing approximations to how anthropology reconstructs the Pleistocene societies. Dunbar noted that the groups fell into three categories—small, medium and large, equivalent to bands, cultural lineage groups and tribes—with respective size ranges of 30–50, 100–200 and 500–2500 members each.

Dunbar's surveys of village and tribe sizes also appeared to approximate this predicted value, including 150 as the estimated size of a Neolithic farming village; 150 as the splitting point of Hutterite settlements; 200 as the upper bound on the number of academics in a discipline's sub-specialisation; 150 as the basic unit size of professional armies in Roman antiquity and in modern times since the 16th century, as well as notions of appropriate company size.

Dunbar has argued that 150 would be the mean group size only for communities with a very high incentive to remain together. For a group of this size to remain cohesive, Dunbar speculated that as much as 42% of the group's time would have to be devoted to social grooming. Correspondingly, only groups under intense survival pressure, such as subsistence villages, nomadic tribes, and historical military groupings, have, on average, achieved the 150-member mark. Moreover, Dunbar noted that such groups are almost always physically close: "[...] we might expect the upper limit on group size to depend on the degree of social dispersal. In dispersed societies, individuals will meet less often and will thus be less familiar with each other, so group sizes should be smaller in consequence." Thus, the 150-member group would occur only because of absolute necessity—because of intense environmental and economic pressures.

Dunbar, in Grooming, Gossip, and the Evolution of Language, proposes furthermore that language may have arisen as a "cheap" means of social grooming, allowing early humans to maintain social cohesion efficiently. Without language, Dunbar speculates, humans would have to expend nearly half their time on social grooming, which would have made productive, cooperative effort nearly impossible. Language may have allowed societies to remain cohesive, while reducing the need for physical and social intimacy. This result is supported by the mathematical formulation of the social brain hypothesis, that showed that it is unlikely that increased brain size would have led to large groups without the kind of complex communication that only language allows.

== Applications ==
Dunbar's number has become of interest in anthropology, evolutionary psychology, statistics, and business management. For example, developers of social software are interested in it, as they need to know the size of social networks their software needs to take into account; and in the modern military, operational psychologists seek such data to support or refute policies related to maintaining or improving unit cohesion and morale. A recent study has suggested that Dunbar's number is applicable to online social networks and communication networks (mobile phone). Participants of the European career-oriented online social network XING who have about 157 contacts reported the highest level of job offer success, which also supports Dunbar's number of about 150. Flight Centre, an Australian travel agency, applied Dunbar's number when reorganising the firm into "families" (stores), "villages" (clusters of stores) and "tribes" (aggregates of villages up to a maximum of 150 people).

There are discussions in articles and books, of the possible application of using Dunbar's number for analyzing distributed, dynamic terrorist networks, cybercrime networks, or networks preaching criminal ideology.

== Reactions ==
=== Alternative numbers ===
Anthropologist H. Russell Bernard, Peter Killworth and associates have done a variety of field studies in the United States that came up with an estimated mean number of ties, 290, which is roughly double Dunbar's estimate. The Bernard–Killworth median of 231 is lower, because of an upward skew in the distribution, but still appreciably larger than Dunbar's estimate. The Bernard–Killworth estimate of the maximum likelihood of the size of a person's social network is based on a number of field studies using different methods in various populations. It is not an average of study averages but a repeated finding. Nevertheless, the Bernard–Killworth number has not been popularized as widely as Dunbar's.

=== Criticism ===
A replication of Dunbar's analysis on updated complementary datasets using different comparative phylogenetic methods yielded wildly different numbers. Bayesian and generalized least-squares phylogenetic methods generated approximations of average group sizes between 69–109 and 16–42, respectively. However, enormous 95% confidence intervals (4–520 and 2–336, respectively) implied that specifying any one number is of limited value. The researchers drew the conclusion that a cognitive limit on human group size cannot be derived in this manner. The researchers also criticised the theory behind Dunbar's number because other primates' brains do not handle information exactly as human brains do, because primate sociality is primarily explained by other factors than the brain, such as what they eat and who their predators are, and because humans have a large variation in the size of their social networks. Dunbar commented on the choice of data for this study, however, now stating that his number should not be calculated from data on primates or anthropoids, as in his original study, but on apes. This would mean that his cognitive limit would be based on 16 pair-living gibbon species, three solitary orangutans, and only four group living great apes (chimpanzees, bonobos and two gorilla species), which would not be sufficient for statistical analyses.

Philip Lieberman argues that since band societies of approximately 30–50 people are bounded by nutritional limitations to what group sizes can be fed without at least rudimentary agriculture, big human brains consuming more nutrients than ape brains, group sizes of approximately 150 cannot have been selected for in Paleolithic humans. Brains much smaller than human or even mammalian brains are also known to be able to support social relationships, including social insects with hierarchies where each individual "knows" its place (such as the paper wasp with its societies of approximately 80 individuals) and computer-simulated virtual autonomous agents with simple reaction programming emulating what is referred to in primatology as "ape politics".

Comparisons of primate species show that what appears to be a link between group size and brain size, and also what species do not fit such a correlation, is explainable by diet. Many primates that eat specialized diets that rely on scarce food have evolved small brains to conserve nutrients and are limited to living in small groups or even alone, and they lower average brain size for solitary or small group primates. Small-brained species of primate that are living in large groups are successfully predicted by diet theory to be the species that eat food that is abundant but not very nutritious. Along with the existence of complex deception in small-brained primates in large groups with the opportunity (both abundant food eaters in their natural environments and originally solitary species that adopted social lifestyles under artificial food abundances), this is cited as evidence against the model of social groups selecting for large brains and/or intelligence.

=== Popularization ===
- Canadian author and journalist Malcolm Gladwell discusses the Dunbar number in his 2000 book The Tipping Point. Gladwell describes the company W. L. Gore and Associates, now known for the Gore-Tex brand. By trial and error, the leadership in the company discovered that if more than 150 employees were working together in one building, different social problems could occur. The company started building company buildings with a limit of 150 employees and only 150 parking spaces. When the parking spaces were filled, the company would build another 150-employee building. Sometimes these buildings would be placed only short distances apart.
- The number has been used in the study of virtual communities, especially MMORPGs, such as Ultima Online, and social networking websites, such as Facebook (Dunbar himself did a study on Facebook in 2010) and MySpace.
- The Swedish Tax Agency planned to reorganise its functions in 2007 with a maximum 150 employees per office, referring to Dunbar's research.
- In 2007, Cracked.com editor David Wong wrote a humour piece titled "What is the Monkeysphere?" explaining Dunbar's number and its implications. In his 2012 novel This Book Is Full of Spiders, the character Marconi explains to David the effect Dunbar's number has on human society. In Marconi's explanation, the limit Dunbar's number imposes on the individual explains phenomena such as racism and xenophobia, as well as apathy towards the suffering of peoples outside of an individual's community.
- In a piece for the Financial Times (10 August 2018) titled "Why drink is the secret to humanity's success", Dunbar mentioned two more numbers: an inner core of about 5 people to whom we devote about 40 percent of our available social time and 10 more people to whom we devote another 20 percent. All in all, we devote about two-thirds of our time to just 15 people.
- In episode 103 of the podcast Hello Internet (31 May 2018) Brady Haran and CGP Grey discuss the reasons the number may be limited to 150, including the ability to keep track of political relationships in large groups of people and the amount of time that people have to devote towards developing and maintaining friendships.

== See also ==
- Size of groups, organizations, and communities
