= John Dies at the End (film) =

- Theatrical release poster
- Directed by: Don Coscarelli
- Written by: Don Coscarelli
- Based on: John Dies at the End by David Wong
- Produced by: Brad Baruh; Don Coscarelli; Andy Meyers
- Starring: Chase Williamson; Rob Mayes; Paul Giamatti; Clancy Brown; Glynn Turman; Doug Jones; Daniel Roebuck
- Cinematography: Mike Gioulakis
- Edited by: Donald Milne; Don Coscarelli
- Music by: Brian Tyler
- Production companies: Silver Sphere; M3 Creative; Touchy Feely Films
- Distributed by: Magnet Releasing
- Release dates: January 23, 2012 (Sundance); January 25, 2013 (United States)
- Running time: 100 minutes
- Country: United States
- Language: English
- Budget: <$1 million
- Box office: $141,951

John Dies at the End is a 2012 American comedy horror film written and directed by Don Coscarelli and based on David Wong's novel of the same name. It stars Chase Williamson and Rob Mayes, with Paul Giamatti, Clancy Brown, Glynn Turman, Daniel Roebuck, and Doug Jones. Despite its mixed critical response, Variety and Wired magazines named it a cult film.

== Plot ==
Slacker David Wong recalls confronting a zombie skinhead he beheaded a year earlier and wonders if an axe that had its handle and head replaced over time is still the same axe. In the present day, he meets with a reporter, Arnie Blondestone, to recount the supernatural events that plagued the small, undisclosed city he lives in.

Some time ago, David is at a party with his friend John, with acquaintances Fred Chu, Justin White, and Amy Sullivan, who has had a hand amputated. David learns that Amy's dog, Bark Lee, has gone missing after biting Robert Marley, a drug dealer who pretends to be Jamaican. The dealer claims to have powers and knows things about David that he shouldn't. As he leaves the party, David sees Bark next to his car.

John calls Dave, demanding he come over at once. At John's apartment, David, oblivious to a bizarre creature only John can see, finds a syringe containing a black-colored drug, John tells David that the drug, "Soy Sauce", given to him by Marley, grants inhuman knowledge when taken, along with dumping the user in alternate dimensions and timestreams, as demonstrated by a past version of John calling present Dave.

As they drive off, David accidentally stabs himself with the syringe, propelling him through alternate dimensions. Returning to the present, a strange man, Roger North, appears in the backseat. Roger puts a strange creature down David's shirt and tells him to drive. David uses the cigarette lighter to burn off the creature. He stops the car and threatens Roger, who disappears.

Detective Lawrence Appleton questions the two at a police station. Appleton reveals that John and Justin White were the only survivors of a drug-fueled afterparty thrown by Robert Marley. Everyone else either disappeared or suffered grisly, bizarre deaths.

In the present, an incredulous Arnie tries to leave, but Dave convinces him to stay after showing him a strange monster in his car that can't be easily seen.

During questioning by the cops, John dies for unknown reasons. While one of the interrogators leaves to investigate John's death, John telepathically contacts Dave. John helps Dave realize the other cop in the room is a ghost and helps him escape from the police station. Dave is then guided to Marley's house. Marley's Soy Sauce knocks Dave unconscious. He wakes up to see Appleton preparing to burn down the trailer, who tells him John's body disappeared and that the Soy Sauce is letting in some kind of evil force. Appleton shoots David, who survives by time-traveling and tampering with the round he was shot with. Bark, controlled by John, drives David's car through the wall, allowing him to escape.

Justin White, possessed, appears in David's apartment and subdues him. Dave tries to kill him but he's infected. Justin kidnaps David, Fred, Amy, Bark, and John and takes them to an abandoned mall, hoping to use a ghostly door inside to travel to another dimension. John manipulates White into going outside, where Appleton kills him. Appleton then explodes into a swarm of demonic insects who then possess Fred, whom David reluctantly kills. Amy opens the ghost door with her phantom limb, allowing John and Dave passage. There they meet North and Albert Marconi, celebrity psychic and exorcist. They reveal the source of the strange happenings is Korrok, an eldritch biological supercomputer who has turned into a genocidal god who wants to travel to new dimensions and conquer them. Marconi gives David and John an LSD-laced C4 explosive to incapacitate Korrok.

The duo steps through a portal to an alternate Earth. Disciples of Korrok greet them as "chosen ones" and present a brutal totalitarian society, where dissenters are maimed by Korrok's monsters. The duo are brought before Korrok, who plans to devour them, absorb their knowledge of dimensional travel, and conquer their dimension. John tries to activate the bomb but fumbles. Bark Lee, who followed the two, grabs the bomb and flings himself into Korrok, sacrificing himself to destroy Korrok.

Upon escaping, David and John meet Marconi and learn that Bark was meant to defeat Korrok all along. After biting a Soy Sauce-addled Marley, it linked him to Marconi and North. Amy becomes David's girlfriend. With Marconi's help, David and John become exorcists and demon hunters.

In the present, Arnie decides to publish the story. Dave realizes he perceives Arnie differently than how he really looks, and the two find the real Arnie decapitated in the trunk of his car, who was killed after first contacting Dave. Dave tells Arnie that Dave's mind projected his current shape. Arnie tries to deny this but soon vanishes into thin air.

Later, John and Dave play basketball and inadvertently throw their ball into a post-apocalyptic dimension. After going in after it, a paramilitary organization informs them they are chosen ones who will restore the world, but an annoyed John and Dave walk off.

== Cast ==
- Chase Williamson as Dave
- Rob Mayes as John
- Paul Giamatti as Arnie Blondestone
- Clancy Brown as Dr. Albert Marconi
- Glynn Turman as Detective
- Doug Jones as Roger North
- Daniel Roebuck as Largeman
- Fabianne Therese as Amy
- Jonny Weston as Justin White
- Allison Weissman as Shelly
- Jimmy Wong as Fred Chu
- Tai Bennett as Robert Marley
- Ethan Erickson as Sergeant McElroy
- Angus Scrimm as Father Shellnut
- Kevin Michael Richardson as Korrok (voice)

== Production ==
In 2007, Don Coscarelli optioned the film rights to the comedic horror novel John Dies at the End. The novel, written by David Wong, was first published online as a webserial beginning in 2001, then as an edited manuscript in 2004, and then as a paperback edition in 2007. Coscarelli stated, "I was greatly impressed by David Wong's crazed originality and impressive imagination. He's like a mash-up of Douglas Adams and Stephen King, both smart and goofy, scary and funny – it really spoke to me. [It] is as addictive as the 'Soy Sauce' street drug that kicks the plot into gear."

Executive produced by Daniel Carey and Paul Giamatti, with producers Don Coscarelli, Brad Baruh, Andy Meyers, Roman Perez, Aaron Godfred, and Josh Lewin, M3 Alliance, M3 Creative, and Midnight Alliance "secretly" began principal photography in October 2010. This was confirmed after hints posted by Coscarelli on his Twitter page were verified. Filming took place on locations in Southern California. On January 27, 2011, Coscarelli announced on his Twitter page that principal photography had been completed and that the film has entered post-production, for extensive visual FX work. The film premiered at the 2012 Sundance Film Festival on January 23, 2012. Variety reported that the film was produced on a budget of less than seven figures.

Coscarelli told Entertainment Weekly, "I had been reading zombie fiction. So I ordered these books and the Amazon robots sent me this email: 'If you like that, you will love John Dies at the End’. And it listed all these things [about Wong's book]. Literally, when I read the email, I thought, 'This would make a great movie.'"

Giamatti called the novel "an embarrassment of riches" and said: "what's going to be tragic is what's going to have to go, because stuff is going to have to go and [...] it will kill me whatever goes, because you want it all to be in there and you've still got to have this stuffed bag of stuff." He also praised the actors and Coscarelli's choices, stating, "Don cast it brilliantly. The actors were so good."

== Release ==
In August 2012, Magnet Releasing announced that they had acquired the rights to the film. The film premiered to wider audiences via video on demand services on December 27, 2012; however, it was only available in the US. It opened in theaters on January 25, 2013. It was released on DVD on April 2, 2013.

== Reception ==
On review aggregation website Rotten Tomatoes the film has 59% approval rating, based on 87 reviews with an average score of 5.60/10. The site's consensus states: "Some will find the darkly funny, genre-bending incoherence of John Dies at the End charming; some will feel its zany antics and gore lead to an unsatisfying payoff." On Metacritic the film has a score of 53 out of 100 based on 27 reviews, which indicates "mixed or average" reviews.

A. O. Scott of The New York Times called it "a ridiculous, preposterous, sometimes maddening experience, but also kind of a blast." IGN editor Chris Tilly wrote, "The end result is a film that veers all over the place; a dark, hilarious and consistently twisted feature that amuses for long periods, bores in patches, and astounds in others still." Variety's Rob Nelson called it "a thoroughly unpredictable horror-comedy—and an immensely entertaining one, too." Steven Rea of the Philadelphia Inquirer rated it 4 out of 5 stars and called it "over-the-top, gross, and funny ... deeply amusing, in the sickest possible way." James Berardinelli rated it 2 out of 4 stars and called it an "interesting failure." Writing at NPR, Scott Tobias said that the film tries too hard to attract a cult following and relies on "calculated insanity". In a highly negative review, Mick LaSalle of the San Francisco Chronicle praised Giamatti's acting as the only good part of the film, raising it from "Worst Movie Ever Made" to "One of the Worst of 2013".

== See also ==
- List of cult films
