= Futuristic Violence and Fancy Suits =

2015 novel by Jason Pargin

- First edition cover
- Author: Jason Pargin (originally as David Wong)
- Language: English
- Series: Zoey Ashe series
- Genre: Science fiction comedy
- Published: October 6, 2015
- Publisher: Titan Books
- Publication place: United States
- Media type: Print; e-book; audiobook
- Pages: 496
- ISBN: 978-1-78329-185-4
- Followed by: Zoey Punches the Future in the Dick

Futuristic Violence and Fancy Suits is a 2015 comedy science fiction comedy novel by Jason Pargin, originally published under his pen name David Wong. It is his third published novel and the first departure from the cosmic horror genre of his John Dies at the End series. The novel follows Zoey Ashe, a young woman who unexpectedly finds herself inheriting and running her late father's criminal empire with assistance from his inner circle, "The Suits." It was followed by two sequels, Zoey Punches the Future in the Dick in 2020 and Zoey Is Too Drunk for This Dystopia in 2023.

The story is set in the 2050s, in a future in most ways similar to the author's present. The key distinction is the prevalence of "Blink", a social media network that aggregates live feeds from millions of cameras worn by users. An AI algorithm automatically selects the most interesting current events and jumps around between feeds with the best field of view, giving the users a god's eye view of reality. With everyone being broadcast live at all times, privacy effectively ceases to exist and everyone, from street vendors and vagabonds to police and criminals, is expected to build and maintain a personal brand to stay on top of what they do.

== Plot summary ==
Zoey Ashe, a young woman living in a trailer park, finds herself the target of an attempted kidnapping. She receives a phone call from Will Blackwater and with his help escapes her pursuer. Blackwater informs Zoey that her estranged father Arthur Livingston had died and asks her to come to Tabula Ra$a, a charter city built by the ultra-wealthy in the middle of the Utah desert. Upon arrival, Zoey is accosted by another kidnapper who displays apparently supernatural powers. Blackwater and the Suits arrive to negotiate, but Zoey manages to set her kidnapper on fire and get away.

Taken to the Livingston estate, Zoey learns that her late father left behind a vault with her brain scan as the only key, which prompted the bounty on her head. Zoey agrees to open the vault, but the only thing inside is Livingston's last will and testament, leaving his entire business empire to her. Still angered for putting her life in danger, Zoey fires the Suits on the spot. That night, a bounty hunter gets inside the estate but is killed by Armando Ruiz, a bodyguard who arrives to offer Zoey his services. Blackwater asks Zoey to meet at the site of her father's death and shows that his enemies possess immense power and will not stop coming after her; Zoey reluctantly accepts his advice. Zoey finds a message from Livingston addressed to her, showing that he was secretly financing research into Raiden - a revolutionary method of energy storage that can power miniaturized implants which give their users apparent superpowers. Nearing its completion, the technology was stolen by a man called Molech who then killed Livingston. The Suits realize that Molech is after the final version of the driver software, without which the Raiden implants are unstable and prone to explode when used.

Molech makes a public demand, revealing that he sent an assassin after Zoey's mother, as the Suits uncover the location of Molech's headquarters. Zoey deduces that Armando has implants and came to her for the software, which she offers to him in exchange for going after Molech. The Suits use their connections to rescue Zoey's mother. Armando storms Molech's base and neutralizes multiple enemies but is killed by a stray bullet, delivering the software straight into Molech's hands. Molech uploads it to his cybernetic arms, which he uses to bring down the Livingston Tower skyscraper using only his fists. He then announces a countdown until his total takeover of the city. The Suits procure an industrial-grade nanofabricator to produce Raiden tech, but have no time to sift through petabytes of unlabeled schematics. Zoey realizes that Molech is a media diva and that upstaging his big event is their only chance of derailing his plans. Preparations begin, but Zoey is kidnapped when Molech's men hijack her self-driving car. She is severely injured and tied with barbed wire to the roof of Molech's car as he begins his campaign of terror.

Molech uses the power of Raiden to obliterate Tabula Ra$a's heavily armed private security, but his victory broadcast is interrupted by the Suits. A man in a cooler version of Molech's supervillain costume congratulates his "underling" and reveals a present for him: the facade of one of the city's skyscrapers has been altered into Molech's nude form, with very small genitalia. Molech abandons his planned tour of conquest and heads straight for the Livingston estate. Easily smashing through layers of security, Molech finds Arthur Livingston inside. Arthur gives Molech an ultimatum: do his conquest anywhere but Tabula Ra$a or he will detonate a nuclear device, killing them all. Zoey's cat passes through "Arthur", revealing him as a hologram, and Molech begins demolishing the estate. The Suits rescue Zoey, who realizes why Arthur had left everything to her: he had built a One Ring-type override into Raiden and could not trust it to anyone who had already tasted power. Gravely wounded, Zoey gets to the nanofabricator and produces the override device. Activating it, Zoey finds that the Raiden implants obey her every spoken command and orders Molech and his men to freeze. They do and are soon killed by the local vigilantes who converge on the scene. While recovering from her wounds, Zoey decides to stay in Tabula Ra$a and her new life.

== Characters ==
- Zoey Ashe: a 22-year-old woman living with her mother in a trailer park. Aware of her status as an illegitimate daughter of a multi-billionaire, Zoey had rejected his gifts and piety the only two times they had met, inadvertently making a very strong impression. Described as average-looking and working as a barista, Zoey has wit and is good with people, but has been isolated from the circles of rich and powerful, ensuring that her well-meaning but naive desires face the cold and harsh reality of how that world works. Zoey can neither reject the inheritance nor use it exclusively for charity without all of her father's enemies coming after her anyway, and thus has no choice but to keep both legal and illegal business venues running.
- Arthur Livingston: a man who made his early fortune by sex trafficking underage warzone refugees, but had a change of heart and attempted to go as legit in his later years. Arthur was one of the founders of Tabula Ra$a as an experiment to prove his libertarian ideas, which made him one of the most wealthy and powerful men in the city after it actually took off. His personal tastes were extremely eccentric and juvenile, with a focus on lavish extravaganza and sexual humour, executed with an absurd amount of money behind it.
- The Suits: Arthur's personal inner circle who de facto run every aspect of his empire. The three men are in their late thirtieths and have met Arthur while working as PsyOps contractors for the C.I.A. Echo is a decade younger than them and was offered a job after impressively cheating at Arthur's casino.
  - Will Blackwater: Arthur's right-hand man and surrogate son. Blackwater is the brain behind most plans, shows no sense of humour and forms an unlikely connection with Zoey who refuses to see the world from his point of view. Blackwater has a deeply fearsome reputation in Tabula Ra$a: when he's accidentally mugged, the perpetrator voluntarily turns himself in, begging for his family to be spared.
  - Budd Billingsley: a southerner from Texas with inexhaustible connections, remembering every face he ever saw and having a contact everywhere.
  - Andre Knox: a large African American man with the ability to procure anything, at any hour, but at a ridiculous price.
  - Michelle "Echo" Ling: a woman with a reputation as a genius hacker, who had in fact simply taught herself common sense computer skills on the job.
- Armando Ruiz: a famous bodyguard who offers his services to Zoey. Having obtained Raiden implants on the black market, he quickly learned of their instability and had never used them until meeting Zoey in hopes of obtaining the stabilizing software.
- Molech: toxic masculinity in human form. The son of an arms dealer, Chet Campbell inherited both the business and the connections that allowed him to keep it running at a young age. With the Tyler Durden-esque ideology of extreme male supremacy, Molech detests the modern world for making the men "soft" and attracts a cult of followers who obey his orders even in the face of certain death. Having come across the Raiden technology, Molech seized it to reshape the world in his image by deciding who else gets it, but had to go slow with his plans to ensure the proper rollout of his media campaign.

== Reception ==
The novel received positive reviews. It was one of the ten recipients of the Alex Awards in 2016.

The New York Times Science Fiction & Fantasy review commented that "this is clearly supposed to be fun, and at that it succeeds wildly" but noted that the subject matter's topicality can make the jokes feel slick and callous. Starburst praised the commentary on the spread of social media and the amount of twists and turns, calling it "a sofa clutching read from beginning to end". Nerdist complimented both the humour and futuristic predictions, postulating the author as "a keen observer of the human condition,... able to translate that into an apt, and often snarky, prediction for society’s trajectory." Writing for the New York Journal of Books, Jake Bible praised the writing style and the mix of humour and violence, calling it "entertaining and well worth every page turn, whether a reader is familiar with Wong’s work or not."
