= Aaron Godfred =

American film producer

- Born: Anchorage, Alaska
- Occupations: Film producer Film director Writer
- Known for: Little Blue Pill

Aaron Godfred is a film, television and digital producer. He was the SVP of development at VENN.tv a television network for gamers, streamers and esports fans. At VENN Aaron oversaw gaming and esports shows including Dare Package, The Sushi Dragon Show with Sushi Dragon, Grey Area, Looking for Gains, Origin Stories, Facecheck and more.

Prior to VENN, Aaron was the Director of Gaming and Public Figures at Fullscreen, a WarnerMedia company, and led the content department at Omaze, a leading fundraising company offering once-in-a-lifetime experiences with celebrities, athletes, musicians and more where he produced award-winning digital content.

Aaron spent the first decade of his career as a producer and creative working for Morgan Freeman's Revelations Entertainment, Marvel, Endeavor, M3 Creative and many others. He also produced cult classic independent film John Dies At The End.

== Early life ==
Aaron was born in Anchorage, Alaska. He attended Linfield College and University of Oregon, where he received his MBA and a Regional Emmy for his short film, Oregon’s War At Home.

== Background ==
Aaron went to Linfield College where he earned a bachelor's degree in international business. He also got an MBA with a sports marketing concentration at the University of Oregon. He started out filming his friends while snowboarding. Possibly the deciding factor in Godfred's decision to have a career in film came about as a result of a project he undertook while still at graduate school. He took a documentary filmmaking course where he produced Oregon's War At Home which was a documentary about the Vietnam War. The film won a Northwest Regional Emmy.

In 2008, he founded the production company Montauk Project Films. Further into his career, he worked for Endeavor Talent Agency, which had represented actors like Matt Damon and Seth MacFarlane. Working long hours there, he decided to pursue the creative side of filmmaking and wrote the script for what would be his first feature film. The script was for Little Blue Pill, a comedy which starred Aaron Kuban, Gerold Wunstel, Trevor Coppola and Jonathan Ahdout. Among the other films he has been producer or co-producer of is the 2010 horror comedy John Dies at the End that starred Chase Williamson and Rob Mayes. He joined Leo/Hartmann Productions to work on production of Jerry The Movie which is a documentary about Grateful Dead guitarist Jerry Garcia. He is also the writer of Don't Get Excited which was set to begin production in 2012.

In February 2014, he was one of the panel of judges at the Southern California Business Film Festival. He is a member of the Silicon Beach club surf group which is a group of techs who surf in Southern California.

== Personal life ==
Aaron is married to author and entrepreneur, Melody Godfred.

== Film work ==
=== Director ===
- Little Blue Pill (2010)
- The Break In (2009)

=== Producer ===
- Jerry: The Movie (documentary) (2015)
- Little Blue Pill (2010)
- The Break In (short) (2009)
- Oregon's War at Home and the Man Who Brought the Peace (short) (2005)

=== Associate producer ===
- Mint Conditioned (short) (2007)

=== Co-producer ===
- John Dies at the End (2012)
- Detective Cook and Ashby (short) (2010)

=== Line producer ===
- The Road to Ruin (short) (2010)

=== Unit production manager ===
- Marvel One-Shot: Item 47 (Video short) (2012)

=== Production manager ===
- The Road to Ruin (short) (2011)

=== Writer ===
- Little Blue Pill (2010)
- The Break In (short) (2009)

=== Actor ===
- John Dies at the End ... Bullet Factory Worker (2012)

=== Technical ===
- John Dies at the End (visual effects supervisor) (2012)

== Television work ==
=== Producer ===
- Channing Tatum Dances at Prank Magic Mike XXL Screening (2015)
- Arnold Schwarzenegger's Guide to Blowing Sh*T Up (short) (2015)
- John Legend Dog Wedding (short) (2015)
- Lowridin with Lopez (short) (2015)
- Acho's Nachos (short) (2014)
