= What the Hell Did I Just Read =

2017 Lovecraftian horror novel

What the Hell Did I Just Read: A Novel of Cosmic Horror
- Author: David Wong
- Language: English
- Genre: Comic horror
- Published: 2017, Thomas Dunne Books
- Publication place: United States
- Media type: Print, e-book, audiobook
- Pages: 370 pages
- ISBN: 9781250135315
- Preceded by: This Book Is Full of Spiders
- Followed by: If This Book Exists, You're in the Wrong Universe

What the Hell Did I Just Read: A Novel of Cosmic Horror is a 2017 comic Lovecraftian horror novel written by Jason Pargin under the pseudonym of David Wong. It is the third book in the series after John Dies at the End and This Book Is Full of Spiders.

The novel continues to follow author surrogate David Wong, his best friend John and his girlfriend Amy, who are living in an Midwestern town, and which is referred to as "Undisclosed" throughout the book. The town has long been a place from which eldritch creatures enter our world from other realities and dimensions, viewing humans as useful cattle at best and disgusting insects at worst. Dave and John have the ability to see these creatures, invisible to regular humans, after encountering a substance known as the "Soy Sauce" several years ago, as depicted in John Dies at the End. This has led to their becoming semi-experts on dealing with the supernatural among both police and the general populace, over the years gaining fame in certain circles, despite both struggling to maintain financial stability.

== Synopsis ==
One night, John and Dave are called to investigate a closed room disappearance of a little girl named Maggie Knoll. After questioning her father, Ted, and following up on the leads, John and Dave quickly establish that the abductor is a supernatural entity that can present itself in different forms, even to people in the same room. As they continue their investigation by questioning Maggie's mother, Loretta, Dave's girlfriend, Amy, is confronted with a doppelgänger of Dave, who leads her to the girl's location under a pond near a collapsed mining shaft. As the girl is reunited with her parents, she identifies Dave as her kidnapper, but Dave and John manage to convince Ted and Loretta that this is another trick of the supernatural kidnapper.

John, Dave and Amy find and trap a small insect-like creature that can disguise itself as any living or inanimate object, inserting retroactive memories of its new form so that it doesn't arouse suspicion. Before they can investigate it, another child goes missing under similar circumstances, whose mother, Chastity Payton, believes it to be related to BATMANTIS???, a large flying creature spotted and filmed in the area. Police detective Bowman arrives to question David on Maggie Knoll's case and finds the second child unconscious in his house, after which he arrests all three of them. The cops take Amy, Dave and John to NON, a government organization with some degree of control over time, alternate dimensions and even death, who question them on the situation. Before NON can wipe their memories, Dave, John and Amy are rescued by Chastity Payton, who takes them to a motel, where she is staying with her son. Chastity explains that her memories are full of plot holes and that she was able to pierce the truth: she never had a son before last night, her memories of him were implanted, but were imperfect and didn't take. Exposed, the swarm of creatures switches to another disguise, prompting the group to flee from an armed biker gang. Dave and John take the Soy Sauce (Note: The origin and properties of the Soy Sauce are established in John Dies at the End (2007)) to get to the bottom of the mystery and awaken two days later with no memory of what happened. They discover that they have made significant preparations and left themselves written messages, but continuously proceed to miss them until it's too late and accidentally release the BATMANTIS??? creature from her confinement. Amy explains that the biker gang became convinced that ten more of their kids have gone missing, and that she has been working with NON to solve the case. Still experiencing lingering effects from the Soy Sauce, Dave and John are now able to see through the illusions, revealing that all documents on the "kids" are, in fact, blank and that "Maggie" is actually a giant larva literally feeding on Loretta Knoll, who does not experience a thing.

Dr. Albert Marconi, a long-time associate of Dave and John with deep knowledge of the occult, arrives in [Undisclosed] after Dave and John mail him their captured specimen while on the Soy Sauce. Marconi theorizes that the smaller creatures creating false memories are worker drones that allow the larvae to feed on the "parent" hosts before they hatch into the Queens, one of which is already living under the pond where the first "child" was found. Marconi designs a method to counteract the illusion, allowing them to capture the second larva and take it to NON, who already have "Maggie" and Loretta in their custody. NON explains that the only reliable way to kill the larvae is with burning sulfur, but when they fire it at the second larva, it begins hatching. Dave and John help NON take it through a portal into a parallel universe and witness as the larva hatches into a towering infernal monstrosity that changes the idyllic world into a hellish dystopia: retroactively, so that it has always been that way. They rush to stop "Maggie" larva from doing the same, but Ted Knoll and his ex-military friends storm the NON facility and rescue his wife and "daughter". Ted sends his family to Marconi, while he and his military group join John, Dave and Amy to blow up the pond mine shaft, believing it to be the nest of BATMANTIS???, the creature responsible for the kidnappings.

On arriving at the site, Dave and John see that the pond is actually an orifice of the giant creature, but are unable to prevent a group of divers from rescuing ten more "children" from it and reuniting them with their biker "parents". They plant the sulfur bomb provided by NON, but Marconi arrives and urges them to remove and disarm it: the known vulnerability was another implanted memory, and the burning sulfur is actually required for the larvae to hatch. Unaware of this, NON arrives on the site and tries to shoot "children" with sulfur pellets. Ted Knoll's armed group joins the bikers in protecting the "children", and a three-way chase occurs, ending at a collapsed bridge. The BATMANTIS??? creature shows up and distracts NON, and Ted Knoll sacrifices himself to kill it, while the bikers take their "children" away. Several days pass, and Marconi theorizes that, unable to go through metamorphosis, the larvae will eventually die just like unhatched eggs. With this new information, NON continues to keep track of all 11 "children" and seals the "pond" to prevent any more from being spewed forth. Detective Bowman’s partner visits the group, demanding to know the truth of what really happened, and Dave, Amy and John tell him the story. The detective notices that Marconi's version of events makes much more sense and accuses them of covering something up, before claiming to have video evidence of David turning into BATMANTIS???. With Amy and John in stunned silence, Dave claims that the video is a fake, and the detective notes that Dave didn't even ask to see it or dismiss the idea that it could exist. Bowman’s partner then drives away, having learned everything he needed to know.

== Characters ==
- David Wong: Author surrogate (Note: David Wong is the pseudonym of Jason Pargin) who narrates his segments from the first-person perspective. Several times during the book it is hinted that Dave is not quite human; he was in fact killed and replaced with an identical doppelgänger with the same set of memories during the events of John Dies at the End, of which only he, John and Amy are aware. Since the events of This Book Is Full of Spiders David had lost his job in a video rental store and has no steady source of income, living with his girlfriend Amy in an apartment over a sex shop. His living quarters contain a large number of "weird" items that his online fans keep sending him: either objects with clear supernatural properties or mundane items that have originated in an alternate timeline. David's self-destructing tendencies are troubling Amy, and at the end of the book, she and John convince him to pull his life together.
- Amy Sullivan: David's girlfriend whose narration is in third person and lacks the profanity of Dave and John's perspective. Amy is missing her left hand that was lost in a car accident (Note: This Book Is Full of Spiders (2012) reveals that Amy's hand was erased from history by one of the Shadow People, after which everyone remembers the timeline in which she lost it in a car crash) and is working in a call center for a home security company, which makes her a suspect in the disappearances that seemed to involve disabling of intruder alarms. Unlike Dave and John, Amy never had any contact with the Soy Sauce and continues to view the monstrous larvae as human children even after the truth is explained to her, insisting on saving them even in the direst of circumstances. As part of the mind games played by the creatures, Amy is visited by a perfect version of David, who admits to all of his faults in their relationship and sets on improving them, only to reveal himself to be not real and tell Amy that she deserves better. This encounter and the following experiences cause Amy to reach out to David, urging him to take control of his life.
- John: Based on the author's friend John Cheese (Note: At the time of the book's publication Cheese (real name Mack Leighty) was an editor of Cracked.com alongside David Wong. He since became the editor-in-chief of themodernrogue.com), John is a long-time close and currently only friend of David. John's third-person narration is extremely unreliable and features him performing feats of incredible badassery and displaying amazing sexual prowess which Dave and Amy have learned to filter out by now. Despite him being in late twenties, John's behavior is incredibly juvenile and includes thrill-seeking in the face of a supernatural threat, calling David in early morning hours with trivial "emergencies" and casual frivolity that results in him being charged with public indecency. Unlike David, who only deals with supernatural out of necessity and is happy to ignore everything that does not present a direct threat, John is extremely enthusiastic about the phenomena they encounter and insists on cataloging them, despite continuously giving them impractical names such as "fuckroach" or "screaming clown dick". While under effect of the Soy Sauce, John gains the ability to control a swarm of creatures that implant false memories, causing them to manifest in the form of Korean adult film actress Joy Park, gaining her mannerisms and assisting the group against the larger threat. "Joy" then decides to stay with John, moving in as a roommate much to his annoyance.
- Doctor Albert Marconi: A former priest who assisted Dave and John on several previous occasions. Despite his reality television personality, Marconi has a deep understanding of the supernatural and is among the most knowledgeable about the true nature of the universe. He is able to deduce the creatures' powers, role and origin from a single specimen sent to him and quickly devises a successful test that can disrupt their supernatural disguises. However, because he is unable to see the larvae's true form, Marconi requires David's assistance when he needs to operate on one of them. Excerpts from one of Marconi's fictional books "Fear: Hell's Paradise" are interspersed throughout the novel.
- Agent Helen Tasker/Emily Wyatt/Josaline Pussnado: A high-ranking NON agent. When she introduces herself to Dave, Amy and John, all three hear different names, which they continue to use throughout their respective narrations. She suffers several mortal wounds during the events of the novel, including a decapitation, but always reappears alive and whole later. From Dave and John's previous escapades in [Undisclosed] she is aware that if NON tried to hurt them, a supernatural harm would come their way instead, which is why she does her best to cooperate with them and Amy.
- Ted Knoll: Former special forces member and ex-husband of Loretta Knoll. He quickly deduces that the disappearance of his daughter does not fit parameters of a regular crime, which is why he calls for Dave and John instead of the police, and is quick to accept the existence of the supernatural, with his military mind processing it as merely a new kind of threat. After "Maggie" is returned to him, he initially blames David for her kidnapping, until Dave and John convince him to direct his anger towards the real threat, unable to tell him that his "daughter" is part of it.
- Loretta Knoll: Ted's ex-wife. When "Maggie" is returned to her, she begins literally feeding on Loretta, taking one bite with her mandibles after another. By the time Dave and John visit her again, large chunks of Loretta's body are missing and many of her organs are exposed, but just like everybody else Loretta herself doesn't seem to feel a thing out of the ordinary.
- Chastity Payton: A single woman living in a trailer park, and the first one to piece together that the kidnappings weren't merely caused by shapeshifters, but the entire existence of the missing "children" was just implanted memories designed to make their "parents" rescue them from the "pond". She leaves the narrative after skipping town, determined to get as far away from it as possible.
- Detective Bowman: A policeman who encounters John and David on several occasions. At the end of the book, his unnamed partner accuses them and Amy of fabricating the entire story to cover up for the fact that David was in fact the BATMANTIS??? creature the entire time.

== Sequel ==
A fourth book in the series was released on October 18, 2022, titled If This Book Exists, You're in the Wrong Universe.

== Reception ==
John Valeri of Criminal Element gave the book a positive review, saying that it "transcends the gags, the gore, the gadgets, and the gratuity... to tell a story of survival that, despite its many absurdities, is one we’re all living." Maddie Crum of The Washington Post gave a semi-positive review, noting that "the brisk story is too often stalled by crass bits" and that issues such as class anxiety are brought up, but remain unexplored.
