= Jason Pargin =

American novelist and humorist (born 1975)

- Born: Jason Keith Pargin; January 10, 1975 (age 51); Lawrenceville, Illinois, U.S.
- Education: Southern Illinois University
- Occupations: Novelist; humorist; Internet personality
- Writing career
- Pen name: David Wong (until 2020)
- Period: 1999–present
- Genres: Satire; dark comedy; horror comedy; science fiction comedy
- Subjects: Popular culture; Internet culture; mass media; American society
- Notable work: John Dies at the End (2007)

TikTok information
- Page: Jason Pargin, author
- Years active: 2022–present
- Followers: 700,000
- Last updated: July 26, 2026
- Website: johndiesattheend.com

Jason Keith Pargin (/ˈpɑːrdʒɪn/ PAR-jin; born January 10, 1975) is an American novelist, humorist, and internet personality. Writing for many years under the pen name David Wong, he founded the humor site Pointless Waste of Time and later served as executive editor of Cracked.com.

He is the author of the comic Lovecraftian horror series John Dies at the End (2007–present) and the Zoey Ashe series (2015–present), as well as the standalone novel I'm Starting to Worry About This Black Box of Doom (2024). John Dies at the End was adapted as a feature film in 2012.

Pargin retired the David Wong pseudonym in 2020, and since 2022 has produced short-form videos regarding social phenomena on TikTok and other social media platforms, which he has credited with sustaining his writing career. Since 2023, he has co-hosted the Mountain Monsters watch-along comedy podcast Bigfeets.

== Early life and education ==
Jason Keith Pargin was born in Lawrenceville, Illinois, on January 10, 1975. Pargin’s family attended an Evangelical church while growing up. He has described his upbringing as "sheltered", living in a small town of approximately 5,000 people at the time. He and fellow writer John Cheese (real name Mack Leighty) attended high school together and met during an art class they shared.

Pargin attended the Southern Illinois University (SIU) radio-television program, graduating in 1997. He credits his college experience with broadening his horizons. While at SIU, he contributed to the alt.news portion of PBS station WSIU-TV's River Region Evening Edition newscast, hosting a recurring segment called Consumer Advocate. Pargin worked data entry handling claims at an insurance agency prior to becoming an author.

== Career ==
=== Internet career ===
==== Pointless Waste of Time and Cracked.com ====
In 1999, Pargin started the humor site Pointless Waste of Time (PWOT), which would eventually be absorbed into Cracked.com. While working at a law firm, Pargin would spend his days copy editing insurance claims and nights posting humor articles on PWOT. Every Halloween on the site he wrote a new chapter of an online story that he published as a webserial. An estimated 70,000 people read the free online versions before they were removed in September 2008. Pargin used the feedback from people reading each chapter of the webserial to tweak what would eventually become the book John Dies at the End.

Demand Media hired Pargin to be the head editor for their revamped online magazine, Cracked.com, although Demand was not aware of Pargin's book deal. As part of the deal, he merged PWOT into the Cracked forums. Pargin has described a disconnection between the old Cracked print magazine and the humor site Cracked.com due to multiple relaunches and almost entirely new staff. As a child, he read Cracked magazine's biggest competitor, Mad magazine.

In December 2012, Pargin published the Cracked.com essay "6 Harsh Truths That Will Make You a Better Person", which argues that personal qualities have value to others through the actions and skills they produce. The essay was discussed by Jesse Marczyk in Psychology Today and therapist Gordon Shippey at CounsellingResource, both of whom examined its argument about the relationship between personal value and action. Pargin later stated that it had received more than 25 million page views.

In another popular article published at Cracked.com, Pargin coined the neologism "monkeysphere" which introduces the concept of Dunbar's number in a humorous manner. Pargin referred to Dunbar's number again in his second novel This Book Is Full of Spiders.

==== David Wong nom-de-plume ====
When Pargin started writing online, he took on the nom-de-plume of David Wong to keep his real and online lives separate. Since much of his writing involved situations similar to his real life, he did not want his co-workers and employers to think that his rants about fictional characters were inspired by real people. The origin of the name was a character from one of his first short stories:

It's not a very interesting story, 'David Wong' was the villain in a story I had written way back in the day, so when I was signing up for my first online accounts in 1998 I started using it. Then when hate mail started coming in with a bunch of racist anti-Chinese insults, I realized I had either gone badly wrong or badly right.

After his book and movie deal, his real name became common knowledge, but Pargin accepted it, saying, "It's not like I'm under the Witness Protection program or anything. I was just trying to keep things simple in my personal life".

In late 2020, Pargin announced that he was retiring the pseudonym, and that future editions of his works would be published under his real name.

==== Social media ====
Pargin began posting regularly on TikTok in 2022, after being encouraged to join the platform by the growth of the BookTok community. His videos tend to focus on social phenomena and have reached a wide audience. By 2025, his clips had accumulated more than 500 million views across platforms. He has credited this online visibility with sustaining his writing career and contributing to the sales of later books, including I'm Starting to Worry About This Black Box of Doom.

In addition to TikTok, Pargin has built a large following on Facebook, where he reported earning significantly more income than from TikTok despite having fewer followers. He also distributes content on YouTube and Instagram. Pargin has spoken about the demands of maintaining a social media presence, stating that most of his professional time is now spent on producing and promoting content rather than on writing itself.

Pargin has commented on the different experiences faced by authors online, observing that female writers often face greater scrutiny regarding their appearance or lifestyle when promoting their work on social media. He has said he makes efforts to promote and support female authors on these platforms.

==== Bigfeets podcast ====
In August 2023, Pargin co-launched the comedy podcast Bigfeets with Robert Brockway and Seanbaby, a watch-along podcast about the cryptid-hunting reality series Mountain Monsters. The hosts humorously discuss each episode and its portrayal of alleged Bigfoot subspecies and other creatures.

=== Writing career ===
Pargin's first novel John Dies at the End was initially rejected by publishers, and he considered withdrawing it from consideration until indie horror publisher Permuted Press agreed to publish it in 2007. A second edition by Thomas Dunne Books was published with additional material as a hard cover on September 29, 2009. Three further novels in the series have been published: This Book Is Full of Spiders (2012), What the Hell Did I Just Read (2017) and If This Book Exists, You're in the Wrong Universe (2022).

Pargin published the first book of the Zoey Ashe series in 2015, Futuristic Violence and Fancy Suits. He has since published two further novels in the series: Zoey Punches the Future in the Dick (2020) and Zoey Is Too Drunk for This Dystopia (2023).

Pargin published his first standalone novel in 2024, I'm Starting to Worry About This Black Box of Doom.

In 2025, Pargin signed a publishing deal with St. Martin's Press for three forthcoming titles: the fourth instalment in the Zoey Ashe series, a standalone supernatural horror novel, and the sixth entry in the John Dies at the End series. The books are scheduled for release in spring 2028, fall 2029, and fall 2031, respectively. According to his literary agency, the standalone novel follows a true crime enthusiast searching for her sister's killer, ultimately uncovering a suburban hotel that serves as a front for an interdimensional being collecting human skins.

==== Adaptations ====
After enjoying some success, John Dies at the End came to the attention of Don Coscarelli, who decided to adapt it as a film. In 2007, Coscarelli optioned the film rights. Filming took place from late 2010 until January 2011 at locations in Southern California. The film, starring Chase Williamson, Rob Mayes, Clancy Brown, and Paul Giamatti, premiered at the Sundance Film Festival on January 23, 2012. It also played on March 12, 2012 at South by Southwest, in Austin, Texas.

== Personal life ==
Pargin is married and has a dog. He lived in Marion, Illinois, before relocating to Nashville, Tennessee.

== Bibliography ==
=== John Dies at the End series ===
Also known as the John and Dave series

| # | Title | Year | Publisher | ISBN |
|---|---|---|---|---|
| 1 | John Dies at the End | 2007 | St. Martin's Press | 9780312659141 |
| 2 | This Book Is Full of Spiders: Seriously, Dude, Don't Touch It | 2012 | St. Martin's Press | 9780312546342 |
| 3 | What the Hell Did I Just Read: A Novel of Cosmic Horror | 2017 | St. Martin's Press | 9781250040206 |
| 4 | If This Book Exists, You're in the Wrong Universe | 2022 | St. Martin's Press | 9781250195821 |
| 5 | There Are No Giant Crabs in This Novel: A Novel of Giant Crabs | 2026 | St. Martin's Press | 9781250285973 |

=== Zoey Ashe series ===
| # | Title | Year | Publisher | ISBN |
|---|---|---|---|---|
| 1 | Futuristic Violence and Fancy Suits | 2015 | Thomas Dunne Books | 9781250040190 |
| 2 | Zoey Punches the Future in the Dick | 2020 | St. Martin's Press | 9781250195791 |
| 3 | Zoey Is Too Drunk for This Dystopia | 2023 | St. Martin's Press | 9781250285935 |

=== Standalone ===
| Title | Year | Publisher | ISBN |
|---|---|---|---|
| I'm Starting to Worry About This Black Box of Doom | 2024 | St. Martin's Press | 9781250285959 |

== See also ==
- Daniel O'Brien
- Michael Swaim
