= Chacko Vadaketh =

Malaysian actor, emcee and voice over artist

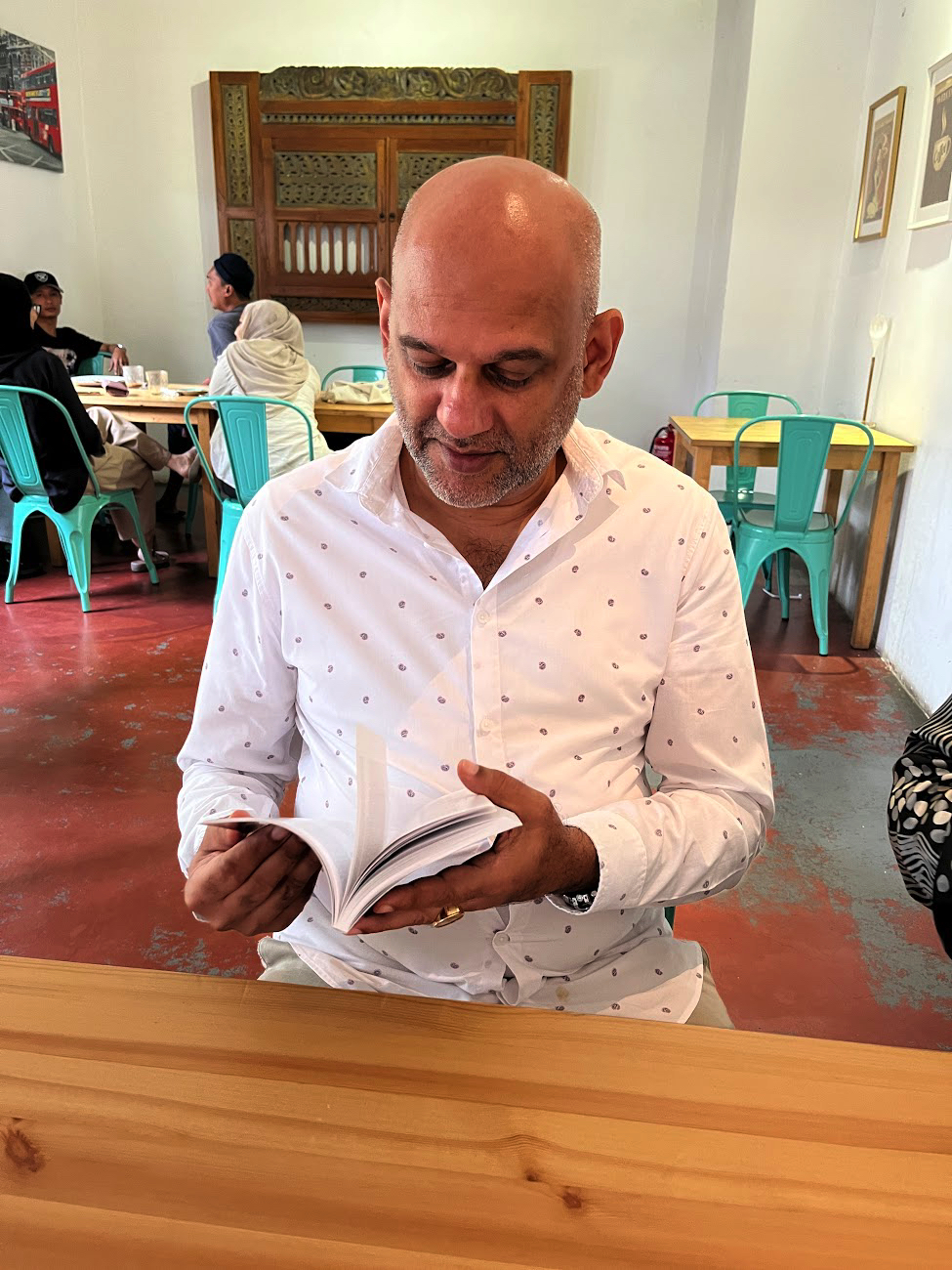
- Chacko Vadaketh 2023 in Kuala Lumpur
- Born: Kerala, India
- Education: Carter Thor Studios, Los Angeles; New School, New York; Barrister-at-Law of Lincoln's Inn, London; Cambridge University (Pembroke College)
- Occupations: Actor; Emcee; Voice Over Artist; Board member
- Years active: 1999–present
- Known for: Guest Star in Cinemax UK/US series Strike Back (2019); Co-Star in BBC One series Our Girl (2018); Coach Tharman in Anak Merdeka (ASTRO 2017); Nat Geo / History Channel Asia series Road to Nationhood (2016-2018); As Sabo Singh in Singapore for all three seasons of sitcom Mr Kiasu (2002)
- Website: https://chackovadaketh.com

Chacko Vadaketh (born 1963 in Kerala, India) is a Malaysian actor, emcee and voice over artist, formerly a litigation lawyer who is part of the Malayali/Keralan Syrian Christian community. He is based in Kuala Lumpur and Los Angeles.

Recent credits include narrator for the Nat Geo/History Channel Asia series Road to Nationhood (2016-2018), host for the Royal Gala for The Prince of Wales in Kuala Lumpur (2017), Coach Tharman in Anak Merdeka (ASTRO 2017), King Bimbisara in Amrapali Singapore (2017), Co-Star in BBC One series Our Girl (2018), Guest Star in Cinemax UK/US series Strike Back (2019), The Bridge (HBO Asia, viu, 2018). Chacko was Sabo Singh in Singapore for all three seasons of sitcom Mr Kiasu (2002): nominated for Best Comedy, Asian Television Awards and played the villain Sarkar opposite Antonio Sabàto Jr. in the movie Princess of Mars (2009).

In August 2023, he was appointed to a two-year term on the Board of the Film Development Corporation of Malaysia (FINAS).

== Early life ==
=== Family ===
His father Tan Sri V.C. George, son of Chacko of Vadaketh house, is a former judge of the Court of Appeal of Malaysia and past president of the Malaysian Bar, and his mother Puan Sri Datin Dr. Rebecca George was a Consultant Paediatrician who moved to Malaysia from India after her marriage in 1962 and worked at the Seremban and Kuala Lumpur General Hospitals and retired as Associate Professor of Paediatrics at University of Malaya Medical Center. She is a pioneer in the study and treatment of Dengue Virus Infection in children, authoring textbooks on it and was a consultant for the WHO. His father was born in Klang, Selangor, Malaysia and his mother in Ooty, Tamil Nadu, India and both are of the Keralan Syrian Christian community.

=== School ===
His primary schooling was in The Garden School and Batu Road School both in Kuala Lumpur. He secured a place to do his secondary education at the Victoria Institution, Kuala Lumpur where he remained for 5 years before going to Haileybury in Hertfordshire, England to do his A levels.

=== University & Acting schools ===
He has a degree in Law and Archaeology & Anthropology from Cambridge University (Pembroke College) and is a Barrister-at-Law of Lincoln's Inn, London.

He studied at the New School, New York by taking classes in Acting for Film and Television; Directing for the Stage and Introduction to Film Making. He studied acting at the Carter Thor Studios, Los Angeles.

His first encounter with Drama and acting was in his pre-teen years under the tutelage of Donald Davies who taught Speech and Drama in Kuala Lumpur at the Federal Academy of Music. He also sang with the church choir was active in church theatre productions at the St Thomas Marthoma Syrian Church in Kuala Lumpur. He got hooked on acting as an undergraduate at Cambridge University playing roles like Othello, Benvolio and Siddhartha. He played Abanaza in musical pantomime for the Cambridge University Light Entertainment Society. CULES with Prince Edward at the Edinburgh Festival Fringe.

=== Work ===
He was a litigator with the law firm Shearn Delamore based in Kuala Lumpur.

== Acting career ==
=== Filmography ===
- Shadowplay ... Hans the Hoarder (2019)
- Tie the Knot ... Dilip (2016)
- Battle Scars ... Dr. Shah (2015)
- Life in Color ... Sangie (voice) (2015)
- Booze Boys & Brownies ... Frances Turquoise (2014)
- The Pink Sorrys (Short) ... Jimmy (2014)
- Arachnoplilia (Short) ... Puri (2013)
- Paranormal Whacktivity ... George (2013)
- SALADIN (animated TV Series) ... super villain The Host (voice) (2012)
- Use Me Up (Short) ... Lily's Co-worker (2012)
- I Am Singh ... Muslim Community Leader (2011)
- Little Blue Pill ... Commercial Director (2010)
- Blue Movies (Short) ... Sayed Mahmoud (2009)
- Princess of Mars ... Sarka / Sab Than (2009)
- The Blue Mansion ... Additional Voice (2009)
- 1957: Hati Malaya ... EEC Thuraisingam (2007)
- Entrapment ... Principal (1999)

=== Television ===
- Strike Back ... Professor Shah (2019)
- That Squirrel DID WHAT?! ... Sergio (2015)
- Paloma ... Motivational Speaker (2014)
- The Bold and the Beautiful ... Muhammed (2014)
- Susanna ... Driver (2013)
- In Plain Sight ... Abu Patek (2012)
- Rules of Engagement - Episode: Rug-of-War ... Ravi (2010)
- The Forgotten ... Bellhop (2010)
- Mr. Kiasu ... Sabo Singh (2002)
- AlterAsians ... Dr. Sam (2000)
- The Bridge ... Anil Raj (2018)

=== Documentary ===
- Kaleidoscope of Rainforest Conservation ... written, directed, narrated and produced by Chacko Vadaketh (2022)
- Road to Nationhood (Nat Geo/History Channel Asia series) ... Narrator (2016-2018)
- Confessions of a Self-Hating Jew ... Yoga Student #1 (2012)
- Aftermath with William Shatner ... Jessica's Iraqi Doctor (2010)
- The Big Durian ... Self (2003)

=== Theatre ===
Roles in Kuala Lumpur including

- Tales from the Scars (2019)
- Love Story (2017)
- Shakespeare Goes Bollywood (2016)
- Love Journey – A Nation Of Two (2015)
- King Arthur (Camelot)
- Capulet (Romeo & Juliet)
- Nehru (Sindhu-A tribute to Nehru)
