= I'm Starting to Worry About This Black Box of Doom =

2024 novel by Jason Pargin

- First edition cover
- Author: Jason Pargin
- Language: English
- Genre: Satire; thriller
- Publisher: St. Martin's Press
- Publication date: September 24, 2024
- Publication place: United States
- Media type: Print (hardcover); e-book; audiobook
- Pages: 400
- ISBN: 978-1-250-28595-9
- OCLC: 1441505112
- Website: us.macmillan.com/books/9781250285959

I'm Starting to Worry About This Black Box of Doom is a 2024 satirical thriller novel by Jason Pargin, published by St. Martin's Press. The standalone novel follows Abbott Coburn, a Lyft driver in Los Angeles, who is hired to transport a passenger and a sealed black box across the United States. The novel deals with internet rumour, paranoia, social media, and isolation.

== Plot ==
Abbott Coburn is a rideshare driver in Los Angeles who also streams on Twitch. He is hired by a young woman named Ether to drive from Los Angeles to Washington, D.C., a journey of nearly 3,000 miles (4,800 km). Ether offers him a large cash payment and insists that a sealed black box be delivered safely to Washington.

The box bears a marking resembling a radiation warning. After a gas station customer notices it, online speculation begins to spread, including claims that it may contain a dirty bomb. The rumours circulate on Reddit, Twitch, and other platforms, causing wider public alarm.

Abbott and Ether are pursued by people who want the box, including an outlaw biker named Malort. Coincidences continue to fuel rampant internet speculation, including Abbott accidentally driving through a road race in Roswell, New Mexico, hitting another driver who tries to block them from crossing a bridge, and fleeing when a police officer asks him to move his car for a 4th of July event.

During the journey, Abbott and Ether discuss their lives, frustrations, and views on other people. Abbott endorses incel beliefs about women having it easier in the modern world than men, which Ether tries to convince him are the result of his time in the "Black Box of Doom" -- the online world of social media whose algorithms fuel engagement by inducing rage. Ether also opens up about her time as a makeup influencer, which abruptly ended when her actions resulted in a near-fatal swatting incident.

Meanwhile, retired FBI agent Joan Key becomes fixated on the possibility of the box being involved in a terrorist attack, and teams up with Abbott's father Hunter to track him down. Zeke Ngata, one of Abbott's online friends, believes Ether to be the mastermind and sets out to rescue Abbott.

All the characters converge at a 4th of July party held by Gary Sokolov, a former friend of Malort's who became a multimillionaire after discovering hundreds of bitcoins on an old laptop. Sokolov, who originally hired Ether to transport the box, apprehends them all. Suddenly, the estate is attacked by Martin O'Toole, the man Sokolov originally stole the laptop from, who built a killdozer after becoming obsessed with revenge. While Abbott and the others evacuate the guests, Malort fights O'Toole and stops the killdozer.

The box is revealed to contain mementos of Sundae Greene, a woman both Malort and Sokolov loved, who died young from cancer after befriending Ether in her final days. Ether convinces Sokolov to make a substantial payment to the family affected by the swatting incident, while Abbott returns to streaming with a healthier outlook on life.

== Publication history ==
The hardback and e-book editions were published in the United States by St. Martin's Press on September 24, 2024. The audiobook was narrated by Ari Fliakos and published by Macmillan Audio. A paperback edition was published in the United Kingdom by Titan Books.

== Reception ==
Luiz H. C., writing for Bloody Disgusting, described the novel as a departure from Pargin's earlier work, with a greater focus on social commentary than cosmic horror. The review said the novel addressed fears about online conspiracies, incel violence, and constant connectivity, while noting that some philosophical passages were heavy-handed. The reviewer gave the novel four out of five stars.

Publishers Weekly described the novel as a "strident and timely" adventure that combines dark humour and satire, comparing it to the work of Kurt Vonnegut and Douglas Adams. The review said the book concerns the anxieties and disconnection of digital life, and called it a "raucous roller-coaster ride".

Kirkus Reviews praised the ensemble cast and pacing, and described the exchanges between Abbott and Ether as both entertaining and introspective.

Justin Soderberg of Capes & Tights gave the novel five stars and described it as a humorous road trip story about technology and social media. He also praised Ari Fliakos's audiobook narration.
