= Zoey Is Too Drunk for This Dystopia =

2023 novel by Jason Pargin

- First edition cover
- Author: Jason Pargin
- Language: English
- Series: Zoey Ashe series
- Genre: Science fiction comedy
- Published: October 31, 2023
- Publisher: St. Martin's Press
- Publication place: United States
- Media type: Print; e-book; audiobook
- Pages: 416
- ISBN: 978-1-250-28593-5
- Preceded by: Zoey Punches the Future in the Dick

Zoey Is Too Drunk for This Dystopia is a 2023 science fiction comedy novel by Jason Pargin. The third book in the "Zoey Ashe series", it follows Futuristic Violence and Fancy Suits and Zoey Punches the Future in the Dick and depicts the protagonist Zoey Ashe as she runs her late father's business and criminal empire in the futuristic Utah charter city of Tabula Ra$a.

The novel picks up five months after the events of Zoey Punches the Future in the Dick in the lead-up to Tabula Ra$a's first mayoral election, in which famously criminal and openly corrupt "Megaboss" Alonzo Dunn is running against Leonidas Damon, a fascist eugenecist operating a law and order campaign. Though Zoey and her support team of "Suits" - Will Blackwater, Andre Knox, Budd Billingsley, and "Echo" Ling - have already pledged to support Alonzo during the previous novel, Blackwater has a more personal stake in the election, believing that Damon is capable and dangerous enough to secure the presidency within a decade if his political career is not stopped dead.

== Plot summary ==
On Saturday, while touring her cloned meat factory, Zoey is attacked by Harmonia, a woman who believes that the meat is sourced from human children. A sex worker at Zoey's establishment goes missing, the third in as many days. Zoey's team pursues various leads, as the video of the first missing girl being brutally tortured is released online. The debate between Alonzo and Damon is pranked by the viral performer Amazing Aviv, causing Zoey and Damon's young daughter to nearly drown. For that, Damon places a bounty on Aviv's head. At night, Aviv uses a custom-built drilling machine to burrow into the basement of Zoey's estate. Zoey finds Aviv in her bathrobe and has sex with him before kicking him out.

On Sunday, Alonzo's niece DeeDee presents a possible lead on the disappeared girls: the famous streamer Rex Wrexx with a history of violence against sex workers and unproven accusations of at least one murder. Zoey and Echo go and talk to Rex, but he has alibis for all three disappearances, streaming his life to public most of the time. A video of the second missing girl's brutal death is released and is used by Damon to boost his campaign. Zoey makes an appearance at a desert music festival, where a video of the third missing girl pleading for her life is broadcast from a stage, sparkling a riot. Zoey is rescued from the crowd by DeeDee, who takes her to the girl from the video. She and the other two are alive and had orchestrated the publicity stunt to get back at Wrexx who had abused all three of them. Wrexx would place a constrictor wire around the womens' necks and tighten it to choke them while promising to severe their heads, only to then release them and treat everything as roleplay. DeeDee kidnaps Wrexx and takes him to Andre's restaurant where Zoey and the Suits discuss their plan.

On Monday, the restaurant is bombed by Harmonia under belief that its freezers contain human meat. The blast kills Harmonia, Rex Wrexx, and Budd Billingsley, while Zoey and her bodyguard Wu are crushed under debris. Wu orders Zoey to leave him and get to safety, but she refuses. The surviving Suits contact Aviv, who uses his drilling machine to burrow under the rubble and rescue Wu and Zoey. Aviv is arrested for his prank at the debate but is intercepted by Pistol Wizard, who puts Aviv in a constrictor wire that would snap shut if he were to leave the bounds of the designated area. Damon uses the bombing and the festival riot to further boost his agenda, gaining a notable lead in the polls. Wrexx's followers are unaware of his death but note his absence. Zoey's team recruit the "missing" girls and Aviv's support crew to implement the new plan.

On election Tuesday, they release "live" pre-recorded video of the last girl being rescued from the torture dungeon of her captor Rex Wrexx, whose likeness and voice are recreated digitally. The video ends with Wrexx being killed by his own torture machine, the onlookers immediately converge on the scene which perfectly matches the video, including the still-warm corpse of Wrexx. Planted actors posing as Damon's supporters use this to push Damon's own demands beyond reasonable level. Zoey's team goes to the Pistol Wizard, who reveals that the constrictor wire is not tied around Aviv' neck, but rather his penis. A large crowd gathers, attracting both candidates and live cameras. Aviv strips naked, runs and somersaults across the boundary line. The constrictor wire snaps shut, severing his penis, which flies through the air and slaps Leonidas Damon in the face, before being recovered and put on ice.

The combination of Damon's public humiliation and people putting in Aviv as a write-in candidate secures Alonzo a narrow margin of victory. Aviv and Wu undergo extensive surgery and are expected to recover. A memorial service is held for Budd, attended by people from all over the world. Zoey realizes that Blackwater had never considered Aviv a security risk despite him breaking into her estate and deduces that he had already pre-screened Aviv for her as a potential romantic partner.

== Reception ==
Writing for Lightspeed magazine, Chris Kluwe praised the novel, describing it as "a non-stop rollercoaster of ideas, musings, insights, and inanities that flow together into a wildly pleasing whole". Kluwe also complimented Pargin for his candid observations on the human condition while noting that the book's pace was suitably frenetic but not too exhausting, and complimenting the colorful personalities of the characters.

Publishers Weekly praised the level of action in the book and concluded that readers "will be just as taken with this unlikely antiheroine as ever".

Beth Tabler in her review described the novel's writing as totally engaging and called it one of her best reads of the year. She pointed out how Pargin takes everyday life issues and elevates them into absurd, noting how every act and spoken word being immediately broadcast social networks leads to "perceptions [that] are wielded like a cudgel." Tabler described the protagonist as "a lot more complicated than you would initially think" while also pointing out how she found several scenes in the book to be harrowing.

Andrew Mather in his overview of the trilogy observed that third book expands of the ideas and introspections of its predecessor and pointed out the disturbing parallels to the 2024 United States presidential election. He described the novel as compelling but not necessarily hopeful and rated it as 9.0/10, higher than the two previous works in the series.
