= Trevor Coppola =

American actor

- Born: Santa Monica, California
- Occupations: Actor, Musician
- Years active: 1995–present

Trevor Coppola is an actor and musician from Santa Monica, California. The films he has acted in include Little Blue Pill, The Hunchback, Matilda, The Bank Job, Lucky Numbers and 3:10 to Yuma and Vikingdom. As a musician, he is a cellist and classically trained singer.

== Background ==
=== Film and television ===
In the early 1990s he had a small part in the television series Love & War, episode "One Strike, You're Out". He played the part of Sal in the film, Lucky Numbers which was directed by Nora Ephron and starred John Travolta and Lisa Kudrow. In 2007, he acted in the Western 3:10 to Yuma. It starred Russell Crowe and Christian Bale. In it, he played the part of William Marsh. In 2008, he had a part in the thriller The Bank Job which was directed by Roger Donaldson. In the 2010 comedy Little Blue Pill which was directed by Aaron Godfred, he was one of the leading actors and acted alongside Aaron Kuban, Adam Carr, Rosie Tisch, Gerold Wunstel and Jonathan Ahdout and Gerold Wunstel. He played the part of ruthless Phalitech executive, John Kilter. In the same year he played the part of Dr. Trevor Gibson in the film The Hunchback. In 2013, he starred in the Yangzom Brauen directed film Who Killed Johnny playing the part of Wulf. In the same year, he was in Vikingdom which was a fantasy, action, adventure that starred Dominic Purcell and Natassia Malthe. In it he played the part of Geat. In 2014, he was part of a reality show hosted by Erin J Morgart. In Empire of the Heart which was released in 2017, he played Jake Fishel.

=== Other ===
In March 2014, he was at the March issue launch party for the Californian Naluda Magazine. Later that year, he was at the International Italian Festival of Neapolitan song for an award presentation.

== Filmography ==
=== Films ===
Film
Title	Role	Director	Year	Notes #
Gao nu yi zu	Rudy	Blackie Shou Liang Ko	1995	
Indictment: The McMartin Trial	Reporter	Mick Jackson	1995	made for television
French Exit	Party Goer #2	Daphna Kastner	1995	
Showgirls	Dancer	Paul Verhoeven	1995	
Heat	restaurant patron	Michael Mann	1995	
Matilda	restaurant patron	Danny DeVito	1996	
Every Minute Is Goodbye	Russ	Ulli Lommel	1996	
Babylon 5: In the Beginning	Minbari Tourist	Michael Vejar	1998	
Time at the Top	Andre	Jim Kaufman	1999	
Wanted	Larry	Terence M. O'Keefe	2000	
Farewell, My Love	Phil Conway	Randall Fontana	2000	
Lucky Numbers	Sal	Nora Ephron	2000	
Last Call	Tom	Henry Bromell	2002	made for television
Got Papers?	Mr. Gomez	Reyes Bencomo	2003	
Down the P.C.H.	Bill	Sean Michael Beyer	2006	
3:10 to Yuma	William Marsh	James Mangold	2007	
Beautiful Loser	Jim	John Nolte	2008	
The Bank Job	Leonard	Roger Donaldson	2008	
Watchmen	NY Swat #4	Zack Snyder	2009	
District 9	MNU Mercenary	Neill Blomkamp	2009	
The Hunchback	Dr.Trevor Gibson	Steve Roeder	2010	
Little Blue Pill	John Kilter	Aaron Godfred	2010	
Simply Delicious	Groom	Jerry Cashman	2012	short
Who Killed Johnny	Wulf	Yangzom Brauen	2013	
Vikingdom	Geat	Yusry Abd Halim	2013	
Creature of Habit	Killer	Marc Verna	2013	
Empire of the Heart	Jake Fishel	Rob Walker	2017	

=== Television series ===
Television
Title	Episode #	Role	Director	Year	Notes #
Love & War	One Strike, You're Out	Customer #2	Robert Berlinger	1995	
Party of Five	Naked	Rick	Daniel Attias	1999	
Beverly Hills, 90210	Laying Pipe	Student	Luke Perry	1999	
Boston Public	Chapter Thirty-Seven	Mr. Roland	Mike Listo	2002	
That Was Then	Episode #1.7	Craig		2002	
LA Forensics	The Actor's Secret	Terry	Robert Dean	2007	
Hallo Hollywood		Impressionist	Yangzom Brauen; Michael Freund; Roman Wyden	2009	
Fringe	Jacksonville	Tech	Charles Beeson	2010	
Doctor Who	Victory of the Daleks	William	Andrew Gunn	2010	
Ruthless	Pilot	Ron	Luis Sinibaldi		

== Music ==
- Across the Universe (musician: cellist) / (singer) - (2007)

In April 2015, Coppola performed with media artist Dilee and acoustic band backing band Cori Jacobs at the Voodoo Lounge at the House of Blues. This was said to be one of the last performances as the club was due to close its doors permanently.
