= If This Book Exists, You're in the Wrong Universe =

2022 novel by Jason Pargin

- First edition cover
- Author: Jason Pargin
- Language: English
- Series: John Dies at the End
- Genre: Cosmic horror
- Published: October 18, 2022
- Publisher: St. Martin's Press
- Publication place: United States
- Media type: Print; e-book; audiobook
- Pages: 432
- ISBN: 9781250195821
- Preceded by: What the Hell Did I Just Read

If This Book Exists, You're in the Wrong Universe is a 2022 comic Lovecraftian horror novel by Jason Pargin. It is the fourth book in the John Dies at the End series, written under a working title "David Wong Dies in This One". It is also the first of Pargin's novels published under his real name beginning from the first edition, after he had abandoned the "David Wong" pseudonym his previous books were published under.

The novel picks up with Dave, his girlfriend Amy and his friend John about two years after the previous book What the Hell Did I Just Read. Now approaching their thirties, the trio lives in [Undisclosed], a dying American Midwest town sitting on a hole in a fabric of reality from which interdimensional entities repeatedly attempt to break through. Having become famous for being able to deal with such situations in the past novels, John and Dave are frequently called upon by both police and local inhabitants, even though a surprisingly large percentage of such calls end up being mundane nonsense. Dave is the main narrator of the story, relating events to the reader in first-person, while John, Joy and Amy supplement him with their third-person accounts.

== Synopsis ==
On July 4, John, Dave, and Amy are visited by a man with an alien parasite attached to his brain. Seeing that he is about to die whether the parasite is removed or not, they prepare to euthanize him in the forest near a public beach. Upon his death, the body explodes into eggs: there was never a man, the parasite only wanted to spread its eggs near a crowded area. They burn the eggs (and the forest) and recapture the parasite, but are unable to damage it and resort to trapping it in a block of solid resin.

On August 22, Time Captain materializes in John's bedroom, but is partially fused into a wall and dies gruesomely. After cleaning up, John and Dave respond to a house call from Regina Galveston, whose 9-year-old daughter, Gracie, exhibits signs of worrisome behavior. They discover Gracie's novelty toy, an egg connected to a smartphone that asks to be fed human body parts through the app, and confiscate it. Amy joins the investigation, and they discover that Gracie was gifted the toy by her older brother, Bas, who has a book from the future and, along with his followers, is trying to perform a summoning ritual. All attempts to stop Bas fail, as he displays teleportation powers, which he uses to retrieve the egg, all while John, Dave and Amy keep simultaneously experiencing missing time, minutes to hours at a time.

The egg's demands escalate, progressing from fingernails, hair and teeth to human tongues, eyeballs and, eventually, whole skins. The attempt to interrupt the final feeding devolves into a massive shoot-out involving SWAT and John is killed. As the summoning is completed and a creature emerges from the egg, time stops. Time Captain approaches Dave and explains that he and his friends have done this countless times before, progressively getting further, but never achieving success. Time Captain offers Dave to reset the timeline again, but as they travel back in time, he is fused into John's wall and dies.

Realizing that, in all previous loops, John ended up dead while his roommate, Joy, never got involved, Dave asks them and only them to come up with a brand-new plan. John knocks on Bas' door and offers him weed; Bas is too surprised to refuse. As they get high, Bas claims that his father, Dalton, killed his other sister, Silva. Unable to prove this to anyone, Bas desired revenge on the entire world and was approached by his old self from the future with the power and knowledge to make that happen. Appealing to Bas' love for Gracie, John and Dave manage to change his mind by promising to remove Dalton from their lives for good. Bas' followers still proceed with the summoning, but Joy uses her powers to put them in a trance and convinces them to abandon the cause, as well.

The preparations already made are too far gone, and the egg completes the final feeding on its own. From it emerges the parasite that travels into the past to approach John, Dave, and Amy on July 4; from Bas' future book, Amy learns that, in the year 2112, it will be freed from the block of resin and complete its goal. The stuffed "Magpie" toy inside the egg turns out to be alive, as well, and begins ripping off people's faces, which remain alive and screaming. Bas, Gracie, Joy, Amy, John, and Dave take cover inside John's van, but the "Magpie" quickly grows large enough to swallow it whole. They use the van's sound system to play holy music ("Free Bird"), which explodes the "Magpie" from the inside.

Dave finds himself outside of time and meets another version of himself. "Fancy Dave" explains that the time loop was part of the summoning: the final stage required 1 trillion human faces, which could only be collected across parallel timelines. They find that future "Magpie" had grown large enough to cover the entire planet, full of screaming human faces. The two Daves come across Bas and his old self, who disappears after Bas categorically rejects the old man. Fancy Dave explains that Bas was the key and that all timelines created as part of the summoning will be undone. Time rewinds back to July 4, only now the parasite never arrives because old Bas was never there to bring it forth in the first place. Only the six people who were inside the "Magpie" when it exploded remember the previous iteration of the next 50 days. Bas approaches Dave to remind him of the promise, which Dave fulfills by killing Dalton Galveston.

== Characters ==
- The Narrator/"Dave": His real name now common knowledge online, he abandoned the "David Wong" alias (Note: Reflecting Jason Pargin doing the same with this very novel), although John and Amy still call him "Dave" in their narrations. His status of the perfect extradimensional doppelganger of the original Dave is explored, and he is confirmed to be the BATMANTIS??? from What the Hell Did I Just Read.
  - "Fancy Dave:" A healthier, successful version from another timeline who is also working on stopping the summoning, despite knowing that this will erase his entire life in which he and Amy have children (which the other Dave fails to realize).
- Amy: Dave's girlfriend, who monetizes his and John's "hobby" by charging their fans to watch livestreams of their investigations. Amy is missing her left hand, struggles with back pain and is blind without glasses, which gives her non-threatening appearance and allows her to connect to 9-year-old Gracie Galveston.
- John: John supplements his online income with numerous other gigs, spending a lot on various dangerous or illegal devices. At one point it appears that no matter the outcome, John is destined to die in every iteration of the time loop, echoing back to the original title of John Dies at the End.
- Joy: A hive-mind collective of 777 shape-shifting interdimensional insects, who at the end of What the Hell Did I Just Read assumed the form of a Korean actress and moved in with John as a roommate. Joy is fascinated with humans and works in a nursing home where she can look after them. Her abilities allow her to save the day as well as help Dave come to terms with his own inhuman condition.
- Dr. Albert Marconi: A reality television personality with actual knowledge of supernatural. Recovering from a heart attack, Marconi is unable to come to [Undisclosed] in person, leaving the group to save the world on their own. After time is rewound, Marconi manages to catch the blockage in time, and Amy pressures him into taking her, Dave, and John on his full payroll.
- The Galvestons: The family of self-help guru Dalton Galveston, who killed his daughter Silva for her perceived promiscuity, making it look like a suicide. Sebastian "Bas" Galveston tried to report on him, but neither police nor his mother Regina believed him. Bas gifted his other sister Gracie a regular store-bought egg toy that only worked as the focal point of the summoning because of his involvement.

== Sequel ==
Pargin announced in 2023 that he had signed a deal for a fifth book in the series, tentatively scheduled to come out in fall of 2026. The book, titled There Are No Giant Crabs in This Novel: A Novel of Giant Crabs, was published in November 2026.

== Reception ==
Publishers Weekly praised the book's "bizarre and vivid visuals" as well as its frank social criticism. Philip Cu Unjieng of Manila Bulletin observed that the book followed "a formula that Pargin has employed with great success over several novels", calling it "a topsy-turvy mess, but that's the Pargin's specialty." Collin Henderson of Horror Obsessive praised the way the book described and dealt with trauma, calling it "hilarious and scary work from an author who has perfected the art of mixing absurdity with existential terror".
