= Robin Dunbar =

British evolutionary psychologist (1947-)

Robin Dunbar FBA FRAI
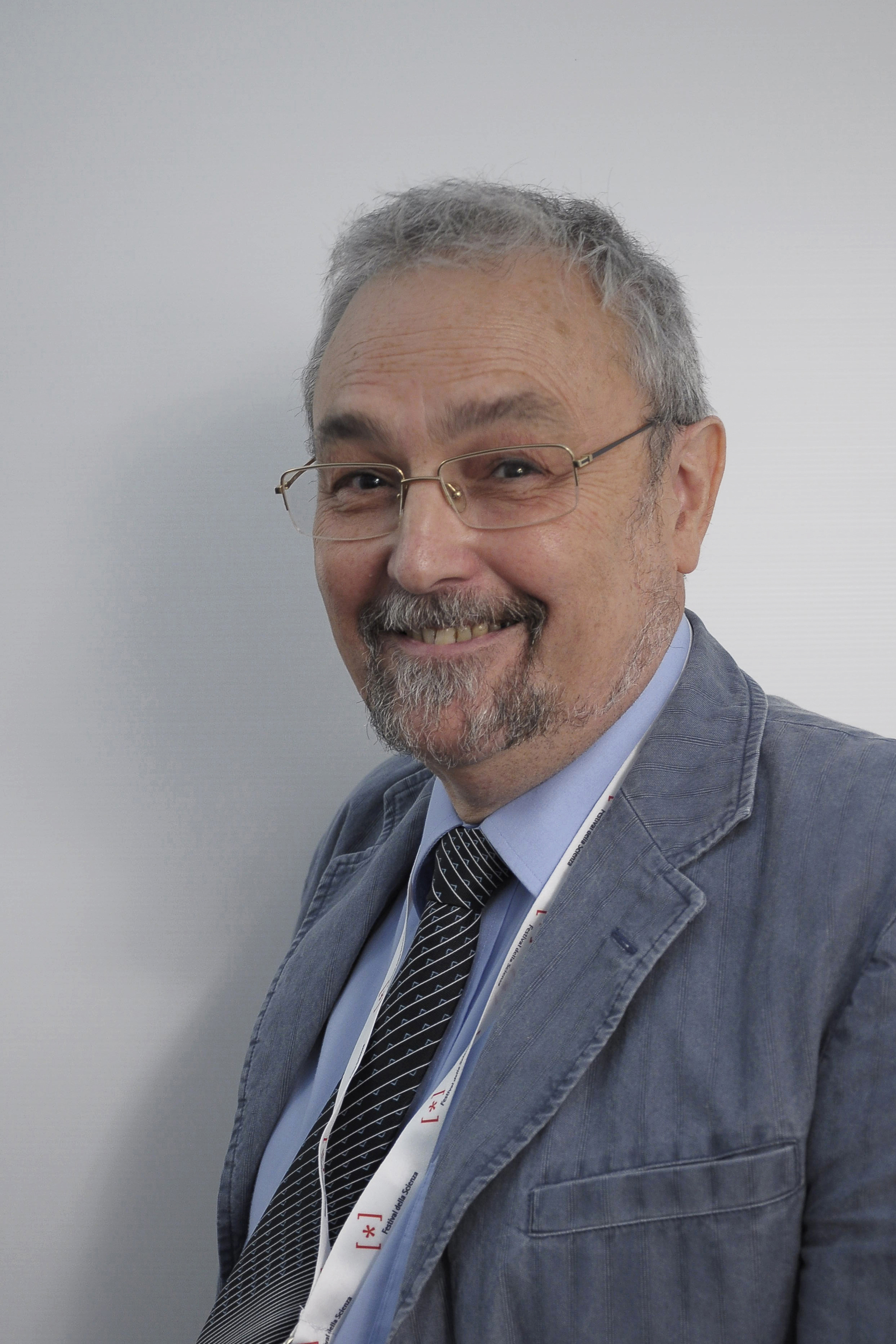
- Dunbar at Festival della Scienza in Italy, 2011
- Born: Robin Ian MacDonald Dunbar; 28 June 1947 (age 79); Liverpool, England
- Education: Magdalen College School, Brackley; University of Oxford (BA, MA); University of Bristol (PhD)
- Known for: Dunbar's number; Social brain hypothesis; Gossip hypothesis; Baboon research
- Spouse: Eva Patricia Melvin (m. 1971)
- Awards: Huxley Memorial Medal (2015)
- Scientific career
- Fields: Anthropology; Evolutionary Psychology
- Workplaces: University of Bristol; Stockholm University; University of Cambridge; University of Oxford; University College London; University of Liverpool
- Thesis: The social organisation of the gelada baboon (Theropithecus gelada) (1974)
- Website: www.psy.ox.ac.uk/people/robin-dunbar

Robin Ian MacDonald Dunbar (born 28 June 1947) is a British biological anthropologist, evolutionary psychologist, and specialist in primate behaviour. Dunbar is professor emeritus of evolutionary psychology of the Social and Evolutionary Neuroscience Research Group in the Department of Experimental Psychology at the University of Oxford. He is best known for formulating Dunbar's number, a measurement of the "cognitive limit to the number of individuals with whom any one person can maintain stable relationships".

== Education ==
The son of an engineer, Dunbar was educated at Magdalen College School, Brackley. He went on to study at the University of Oxford as an undergraduate student at Magdalen College, Oxford, where his teachers included Niko Tinbergen; he completed his Bachelor of Arts in Psychology and Philosophy in 1969. Dunbar then went on to the Department of Psychology of the University of Bristol and completed his PhD in 1974 on the social organisation of the gelada, Theropithecus gelada, a monkey that is a close relative to baboons.

== Career and Research ==
Dunbar spent two years as a freelance science writer. Dunbar told BBC Radio interviewer Jim Al-Khalili in The Life Scientific in 2019 that he "got his first real job" only at the age of 40.

Dunbar's career includes appointments at the University of Bristol, University of Cambridge from 1977 until 1982, and University College London from 1987 until 1994. In 1994, Dunbar became Professor of Evolutionary Psychology at the University of Liverpool, but left Liverpool in 2007, to take up the post of Director of the Institute of Cognitive and Evolutionary Anthropology at the University of Oxford. In 2012, Dunbar migrated over to the Department of Experimental Psychology at the University of Oxford, after receiving a competitive research grant from the European Research Council. His former postdoctoral students include Anna Machin.

Dunbar was formerly co-director of the British Academy Centenary Research Project (BACRP) "From Lucy to Language: The Archaeology of the Social Brain" and was involved in the BACRP "Identifying the Universal Religious Repertoire".

Digital versions of selected published articles authored or co-authored by him are available from the University of Liverpool Evolutionary Psychology and Behavioural Ecology Research Group.

In 2015, Dunbar was awarded the Huxley Memorial Medal—established in 1900 in memory of Thomas Henry Huxley—for services to anthropology by the council of the Royal Anthropological Institute of Great Britain and Ireland, the highest honour at the disposal of the RAI. Dunbar is also a Humanists UK Distinguished Supporter of Humanism.

=== Awards and honours ===
- 2026, International Cosmos Prize, Expo '90 Foundation, Japan
- 2019, Human Roots Award, MONREPOS
- 2015, Huxley Memorial Medal, Royal Anthropological Institute of Great Britain and Ireland
- 1998, Elected Fellow of the British Academy (FBA)
- 1994, ad hominem Chair, Psychology, University of Liverpool

=== In popular culture ===
Dunbar's work is mentioned in The Big Bang Theory, Season 4, Episode 20 ("The Herb Garden Germination"), when Amy Farrah Fowler is talking with Sheldon Cooper while listening to a lecture by Brian Greene (2011).

Dunbar is a featured character in the adaptation of Yuval Noah Harari's book Sapiens: A Brief History of Humankind into graphic novel (2020).

Dunbar's work is described in the epilogue of Blake Crouch's novel Upgrade (2022).

=== Published books ===
- Dunbar. 1984. Reproductive Decisions: An Economic Analysis of Gelada Baboon Social Strategies. Princeton University Press ISBN 0-691-08360-6
- Dunbar. 1987. Demography and Reproduction. In Primate Societies. Smuts, B.B., Cheney, D.L., Seyfarth, R.M., Wrangham, R.W., Struhsaker, T.T. (eds). Chicago & London:University of Chicago Press. pp. 240–249 ISBN 0-226-76715-9
- Dunbar. 1988. Primate Social Systems. Chapman Hall and Yale University Press ISBN 0-8014-2087-3
- Foley, Robert & Dunbar, Robin (14 October 1989). "Beyond the bones of contention". New Scientist Vol.124 (No.1686) pp. 21–25.
- Dunbar. 1996. The Trouble with Science. Harvard University Press. ISBN 0-674-91019-2
- Dunbar (ed.). 1995. Human Reproductive Decisions. Macmillan ISBN 0-333-62051-8
- Dunbar. 1997. Grooming, Gossip and the Evolution of Language. Harvard University Press. ISBN 0-674-36334-5
- Runciman, Maynard Smith, & Dunbar (eds.). 1997. Evolution of Culture and Language in Primates and Humans. Oxford University Press.
- Dunbar, Knight, & Power (eds.). 1999. The Evolution of Culture. Edinburgh University Press ISBN 0-8135-2730-9
- Dunbar & Barrett. 2000. Cousins. BBC Worldwide: London ISBN 0-7894-7155-8
- Cowlishaw & Dunbar. 2000. Primate Conservation Biology. University of Chicago Press ISBN 0-226-11636-0
- Barrett, Dunbar & Lycett. 2002. Human Evolutionary Psychology. London: Palgrave ISBN 0-691-09621-X
- Dunbar, Barrett & Lycett. 2005. Evolutionary Psychology, a Beginner's Guide. Oxford: One World Books ISBN 1-85168-356-9
- Dunbar. 2004. The Human Story. London: Faber and Faber ISBN 0-571-19133-9
- Dunbar. 2010. How Many Friends Does One Person Need?: Dunbar's Number and Other Evolutionary Quirks. London: Faber & Faber ISBN 978-0571253432 (paper)
- Dunbar. 2014. Human Evolution. Pelican Books ISBN 978-0141975313
- Dunbar. 2016. Human Evolution: Our Brains and Behavior (Illustrated) ISBN 0-1906-1678-4
- Dunbar. 2021. Friends: Understanding the Power of our Most Important Relationships. Little, Brown and Company ISBN 978-1408711736
- Dunbar. 2022. How Religion Evolved: And Why It Endures. Pelican Books ISBN 978-0241431788
- Camilleri, Rockey & Dunbar. 2023. The Social Brain: The Psychology of Successful Groups London: Penguin ISBN 978-1847943620

=== Papers ===
- Dunbar (2020): "Structure and function in human and primate social networks: Implications for diffusion, network stability and health". Proceedings of the Royal Society A 476.2240 (2020): 20200446.
- Dunbar & Susanne Shultz (2023): "Four errors and a fallacy: pitfalls for the unwary in comparative brain analyses". Biological Reviews 98.4 (2023): 1278–1309.
- Dunbar (2024): "The social brain hypothesis–thirty years on". Annals of Human Biology 51.1 (2024): 2359920.
