= This Book Is Full of Spiders =

2012 novel by Jason Pargin

This Book Is Full of Spiders: Seriously, Dude, Don't Touch It
- Author: Jason Pargin (as David Wong)
- Language: English
- Published: 2012, Thomas Dunne Books
- Publication place: United States
- Media type: Print, e-book, audiobook
- Pages: 416 pages
- ISBN: 0312546343
- Preceded by: John Dies at the End
- Followed by: What the Hell Did I Just Read

This Book Is Full of Spiders: Seriously, Dude, Don't Touch It (originally known under its working title of John and Dave and the Temple of X'al'naa'thuthuthu) is a 2012 comic Lovecraftian horror novel written by Jason Pargin, under the pseudonym David Wong. The novel is a sequel to Wong's book John Dies at the End, which was initially published as a webserial and later as a printed novel. This Book Is Full of Spiders was first published in hardback on October 2, 2012 through Thomas Dunne Books and chronicles the further adventures of John and Dave, who are living in an Undisclosed American Midwest town, which has a long history of horrific occurrences with supernatural roots. John and Dave have the unique ability to see things that ordinary people cannot after taking a mysterious drug known as the "Soy Sauce" during events of John Dies at the End.

== Synopsis ==
While attending court-ordered therapy session with Dr. Bob Tennet, David shows him a video of a man walking through a door and disappearing instantly, suggesting that the man was teleported someplace else, neglecting to mention that he and John have found and used multiple such doors throughout the city of [Undisclosed]. That night, David is attacked by a spider-like creature in his bedroom, but manages to fight it off. Police officer Burgess arrives to investigate the disturbance, but even looking directly at it, he cannot see the spider, who climbs into his throat. Dave and John take him to the hospital, where the creature takes control of Burgess' body and escapes after killing several people. John proceeds to track him down, but Burgess comes back after David in his home, who manages to decapitate it, before discovering that the spider has laid eggs in his room, which are now hatching. Superstar police detective Falconer arrives to question David, who manages to convince him of the invisible threat. Falconer attempts to quarantine the room, but John and Dave decide to burn the spiders along with the house instead. This backfires when the spiders escape and begin attacking firefighters on the scene, instantly turning their bodies into the violent monsters "like Optimus Prime made of meat". The entire town is locked off by military, and John and Dave escape through a portal door, but become separated and John believes David to be dead.

John travels to a town two hours away where David's girlfriend Amy is attending college and convinces her that they will go back for David soon, and proceeds to spend a week drinking heavily to numb his pain, while panic spreads throughout the country. David is put into the hospital grounds, where a government agency known as REPER had established a quarantine area and uses his unique ability to see the spiders to identity the infected among the new arrivals, who are then immediately executed and burned, keeping the hospital infection-free. Dr. Albert Marconi arrives to investigate the outbreak and reveals to Dave his findings: many of the infected remain completely lucid for days and may potentially never "turn" into monsters at all. An old tunnel in the basement is discovered and a group attempts to make a break through it. Amy decides to get to David by turning herself in, but is stopped by a group of zombie enthusiast survivalists, and John is captured instead. He is taken to the REPER command center in an asylum next to the hospital and discovers Bob Tennet running the operation before meeting with Falconer. The two decide to break out and John improvises by blowing up oxygen tanks, compromising the containment area and causing the entire REPER force to pull out of town. Amy joins the zombie enthusiasts who travel to [Undisclosed], believing they could help the situation. They venture into the now-abandoned asylum building and, when the group from the hospital arrives through a tunnel, they panic and massacre them all, only for the sounds to attract the actual monsters, who slaughter them in turn. David's dog, Molly, leads Amy into the REPER command center, where Amy begins to gain access to their system.

John improvises a rescue mission for David by ramping his Cadillac over the quarantine's security perimeter, then using it to breach it from the inside. A town mob that believes everyone inside the hospital to be infected and beyond hope attempts to stop them, but John and Dave escape through a portal door and reach the asylum, where they reunite with Amy. They meet an infected man named Carlos, who reveals to them the true extent of the situation: there are way, way more infected than anyone estimates, and it had been that way for a very, very long time. However, most of the infected either have no idea or manage to keep their parasites in check, and the outbreak happened only because Tennet and others like him have found an infrasound frequency that causes the spiders to turn their hosts into monsters and go into frenzy. Because anyone, anywhere can be carrying a parasite and the infected are clearly recognized as no longer human, the entire scenario was engineered to cause a mass paranoia, which will lead to the breakdown of society, and the government now plans to carpet-bomb the entire town to hide the fact that only a small minority was ever infected.

John, David and Amy decide to stop the aerial bombardment by destroying the REPER signal jammer, which prevents the inhabitants from getting the truth out. They bring out the "furgun" - a weapon they acquired on a previous occasion which can shape reality according to its wielder, but is extremely dangerous and difficult to control. They reach the jammer, where they are apprehended by REPER and Dr. Tennet, but Falconer, disguised as a REPER operative, busts them out and, together, they take Tennet into the blast zone, but he refuses to call off the attack. With only minutes left, John arranges the town inhabitants into the shape of a giant human penis, proving to the pilots that people inside [Undisclosed] are undeniably human. The bombs are still released onto the REPER command center, destroying all signs of their involvement. Desperate to finish his mission, Tennet emits the special signal, which turns the entire REPER force, who have been infected all along, into monsters who begin attacking the military. The "shadow men" - malevolent beings outside of time and reality - begin closing in on John and David, who, in panic, uses the furgun to summon a traditional depiction of Jesus, which burns the shadow men, as well as the spiders that control the REPER force. A stray bullet is about to hit Amy, but Amy's dog, Molly, puts herself in its path and, with the signal jammer down, John livestreams the video of a small, harmless, definitely non-zombified girl crying over her dog to show that the people of [Undisclosed] are still human to the entire world. In the end, only 68 people are confirmed to have been truly infected, while 406 more have been killed during the mass hysteria. David makes a hobby of telling a brand new version of the events to each reporter who approaches him and plans to make up an even crazier one for his eventual book.

== Characters ==
- David Wong: Author surrogate. He holds a job in a video rental store and has to attend court-mandated therapy sessions after accidentally injuring a bystander during his latest encounter with a supernatural threat. During the initial outbreak, a misunderstanding causes David to believe that his girlfriend Amy might be inside the town, which leads to him going back and becoming separated from John. While in quarantine David is administered a drug which causes him to lose a chunk of time, after which he has to rediscover his own actions during the last week. A single remark during the novel hints that David is not quite human himself; he was in fact killed and replaced with a doppelgänger of unknown origin with all of David's memories during the events of John Dies at the End, of which only he, John and Amy are aware.
- John: David's best friend. John is capable of quick thinking, but is also very reckless, and at several points his involvement only makes the situation worse. After an accident with a teleporting door leads him to see only a splatter of brains where David should be, John believes his friend to be dead, but doesn't have the nerve to tell Amy and a tries to drink his pain away instead. After breaking himself and Falconer out of the asylum, John takes a dose of the Soy Sauce, which allows him to stop time, but leaves him completely unable to manipulate any of the environment while doing so.
- Amy Sullivan: David's girlfriend who attends college in a nearby town, who becomes a point of view character after having only supporting role in the previous book. Amy struggles with constant back pain and is missing her left hand as a result of the car accident a few years ago, and during the climax of the novel one of the Shadow Men passes through Amy's left hand, erasing it from history retroactively. After hearing about the initial attack by the infected officer Burgess on the news, Amy takes the bus to [Undisclosed] despite David's protests and arrives just in time for the outbreak, which leads David to believe that she might be in danger, while she is in fact stopped by the military before she can enter town. Amy spends a week planning on how to reach Dave, and when John proves to be of no help, attempts to turn herself in before taking a ride back with a group of zombie enthusiasts, despite never taking them seriously and viewing them as children. After she reaches the main headquarters of REPER which were abandoned in a great hurry, Amy uses both her computer knowledge and social engineering to gain access to their systems, which provides the invaluable knowledge and allows her to call for outside help.
- Lance Falconer: A famous police detective who arrives to [Undisclosed] to investigate the original attack by officer Burgess. Falconer instantly suspects David Wong and is about to arrest him after finding him with Burgess' body, but David manages to convince him of what is really going on by allowing a spider to bite him on his arm, which to Falconer looks like a patch of skin instantly disappearing. After John and Dave accidentally violate his initial orders to keep the spiders contained, Falconer begins to blame them for the outbreak and the resulting deaths, but changes his mind after he is apprehended by REPER, allowing him to see that the whole thing was specifically orchestrated. Throughout the novel, Falconer is described as wearing impossibly cool clothes, driving a Porsche which no cop could possibly afford and being recognized from his previous famous exploits everywhere. In the aftermath of the events, Falconer reveals that while many key participants managed to secure book deals, he did not because his perspective was too familiar to John's and David's, whom he spend the majority of his time with. David agrees to take him on as a collaborator for his own book and promises to embellish both his role and his character to an absurd degree, which evidently happened.
- Doctor Albert Marconi: A television personality with actual knowledge of the supernatural, who became an acquaintance of John and David during the events of John Dies at the End. John contacts him after the outbreak and Marconi willingly enters the quarantine area, where he spends a week tending to the patients. Marconi discovers that David's method of detecting the infection is imperfect, as he was only checking the patients' mouths while the parasite can also enter the body through the anus. Despite this, Marconi finds that the infected in the hospital show no discernible symptoms and do not "monster out" for days, while those infected during the initial outbreak did so immediately, under the live cameras. This allows Marconi to deduce that the goal of the outbreak was not to infect the population, but to spread fear and paranoia, breaking down the fabric of trust that allows the society to function. The novel also contains excerpts from Marconi's fictional book "Science and Beyond".
- Owen: An acquaintance of John who is put into the quarantine, where he discovers the only working gun left there by mistake and uses it to give himself the authority to establish rules. Owen and his followers proceed to execute and burn everyone identified as infected by David, relying on his ability to see the spiders, despite not trusting his character.
- Dr. Bob Tennet: David's court-appointed therapist and an expert on mass panic and crowd behavior, which leads the government to turn to his expertise during the outbreak. Tennet's exact nature is left unclear: he himself claims to have a wife and kids and insists that he does not known the identities of his superiors and only does what needs to be done; Marconi theorizes that Tennet's decades of practice and multiple published works are real because he retroactively made them so, creating the exact persona that would be in the position to take control when time came as needed; while Carlos reveals that he sees Tennet as one of the Shadow Men, but he does not behave in the way that other Shadow Men encountered by John and David do.
- Carlos: A man infected with a parasite and a father of an eight-year old named Anna. She turns into a monster when she is scared, but for her that situation is not new and Carlos has been aware of it the whole time. The revelations made by Carlos confirm Marconi's information and complicate the situation for Dave, John and Amy, as the infected are not only proved capable of being non-hostile, but are shown to be far more numerous and widespread to eliminate completely.

== Reception ==
Critical reception for This Book Is Full of Spiders has been predominantly positive. Publishers Weekly and Tor.com both praised the novel, Tor.com highlighting the character of Amy as one of their favorite parts of the book. SF Signal gave This Book Is Full of Spiders an overwhelmingly positive review, stating that it was "Kevin Smith's Clerks meets H. P. Lovecraft" and that "this exceptional thriller [...] makes zombies relevant again."

== Sequel ==
A third book in the series was released on October 3, 2017, under the title What the Hell Did I Just Read: A Novel of Cosmic Horror.
