= Little Blue Pill (film) =

- Directed by: Aaron Godfred
- Written by: Aaron Godfred
- Starring: Aaron Kuban; Adam Carr; Rosie Tisch; Gerold Wunstel; Trevor Coppola; Jonathan Ahdout; Ashley Whittaker
- Cinematography: Lucas Lee Graham
- Edited by: Simon Carmody
- Music by: Jason Retana
- Distributed by: GoDigital Media Group; Montauk Project Films
- Release date: 2010
- Running time: 93 min
- Country: United States
- Language: English

Little Blue Pill is an American comedy film that starred Aaron Kuban, Adam Carr, Rosie Tisch, Gerold Wunstel, Trevor Coppola, Jonathan Ahdout, Ashley Whittaker and Chacko Vadaketh.

== Plot ==
Stephen (played by Aaron Kubanis) accidentally takes two erectile dysfunction pills and has various troublesome situations and misadventures. Thinking he's taken pills for a headache, he becomes more and more aroused every time he sees a woman or when one comes near him. During the course of his mis-adventure he ends up at the hospital, a jail, a retirement home, and a brothel. There's even a subplot of sorts involving a corrupt drug company and an obsessed German scientist Johan Von Luther played by Gerold Wunstel.

== Production ==
This was the debut film from director Aaron Godfred and made on a low budget. In August 2008, director/ writer Godfred started off writing the script for the film as a short but eventually it went out to 37 pages which was way to long to keep the film as a short. Most of the leads for the film came from LAcasting.com. The film was shot in July 2009 and done over 4 six-day weeks By the middle of August that year they had completed a rough cut. In around 10 months the film was completed. The film's premiere was held at the Hollywood Theatre in Portland on Saturday March 26 at 9 pm.

== Cast ==
- Jonathan Ahdout ... Dr. Hrundi Bhatnagar
- Chacko Vadaketh ... Commercial Director
- Maren McGuire ... Bar Wench
- Amber Chase ... Adult Star
- Jessica Salazar ... Daughter
- Gerold Wunstel ... Dr. Johan Von Luther
- Aaron Kuban ... Stephen
- Ava Ellen Stephan ... Phalitech Employee
- Catherine Johnson ... Jasmine
- Rich Cashin ... Ripped Aryan
- Trevor Coppola ... John Kilter
- Adam Carr ... Oscar
- Harvey Kalan ... Commercial Husband
- Malice ... Tammy
- Jeff Gorham ... Evan Swartzberg
- Deb Kalan ... Commercial Wife
- Rosie Tisch ... Lane
- Krista Nicoli ... Party Girl
- Kristin Coleman ... Maggie Cohen
- Mary Nelson ... High School Girl #2
- Robert Burton ... Shane
- Cesar Salazar ... Father
- Kareem Hill ... Spencer Nair
- Mark Franklin ... Murderer
- Robert J. Olin Plainclothes Cop
- Ellen Bloodworth ... Dolores
- Angela Hahn ... Frances
- Jeremiah Benjamin ... Test Subject #8
- Stephanie Blair ... Miriam Schwartzberg
- Kate Anderson ... Amanda
- Teresa Decher ... High School Girl #1
- Brenan Dwyer .. Lanna
- Steve Koeppen ... Lewd Wino
- Donna Scholars ... Darlene
- Frankie Fronk ... Test Subject #4
- Harold Phillips ... Detective
- Jake Rossman ... Prison Guard
- Michael Rouches ... Police Seargent
- Frank Woodman ... Larry Cohen
- Teresa Lawrence ... Elle Bentley
- Ashley Whittaker ... Dr. Jana Ondeck
- Jessica Burbank ... Marla
- Akbar Kedear ... Ginno
- Jenny Fink ... Irate Mother
- Anne Sheridan Kennedy ... Laboratory Scientist
- Jennifer Ahlbom ... Bomb Girl
- Matt Stockalper ... Hans
- Matthew Sa ... Jason Deniel
- Michael E. Thomas ... Angry Neighbor
- Noraa Derfdog ... Irate Truck Driver

== Links ==
- Little Blue Pill The Movie
- Little Blue Pill at Imdb
