= Zoey Punches the Future in the Dick =

2020 novel by Jason Pargin

- Paperback edition, the first to be published under Pargin's real name
- Author: Jason Pargin (originally as David Wong)
- Language: English
- Series: Zoey Ashe series
- Genre: Science fiction comedy
- Published: October 13, 2020
- Publisher: Titan Books
- Publication place: United States
- Media type: Print; e-book; audiobook
- Pages: 386
- ISBN: 978-1-250-83348-8
- Preceded by: Futuristic Violence and Fancy Suits
- Followed by: Zoey Is Too Drunk for This Dystopia

Zoey Punches the Future in the Dick is a 2020 science fiction comedy novel by Jason Pargin and a sequel to his Futuristic Violence and Fancy Suits. It was the last book by Pargin published under his pen name "David Wong" which he abandoned shortly after; the paperback edition was published under his real name instead. The second novel in what became colloquially called "the Zoey Ashe series", it was followed by Zoey Is Too Drunk for This Dystopia in 2023.

Set ten months after the events of the previous novel, (Note: Futuristic Violence and Fancy Suits is set at Christmas time, this book takes place on next year's Halloween) the book picks up with the protagonist Zoey Ashe as she settles into the role of "heiress" of her late father's vast business and criminal empire in the fictional charter city of Tabula Ra$a. Suddenly having access to unimaginable wealth, Zoey cannot help but enjoy it in contrast to her previous life, while also understanding that it was built on blood money and exploitation of the underprivileged. She also finds that her wealth makes her the target of constant harassment attacks, only some of which are instigated by her equally wealthy enemies. The prominence of Raiden (Note: Miniaturized implants which give their users de-facto superpowers) is reduced compared to the previous novel, with more focus being given to the power of manipulating people's perception through the various forms of media.

== Plot summary ==
A man named Dexter Tilley uses his Raiden implants to take hostages at one of Zoey's sex work establishments. Zoey arrives to meet his demands and surrenders herself to Tilley while the Suits running her operations - Will Blackwater, Andre Knox, Budd Billingsley, and "Echo" Ling - stay back. Letting herself be taken out of the earshot of the cameras, Zoey uses her secret personal override to disable Tilley's implants, immobilizing him. She then decides to give Tilley a second chance at life, which Blackwater disapproves of.

One month later Tilley turns up dead, his body missing most of the organs. "Blowback", an online group of Zoey haters, accuses her and the Suits of ritually cannibalizing Tilley and offer a substantial bounty for proof. The bounty is traced to Titus Chobb, the owner of the largest private security company in Tabula Ra$a. Zoey attempts to treat with him, but Chobb denies any involvement. On her way from the meeting, Zoey's car comes under a coordinated attack; Will, Zoey, and her bodyguard Wu only barely manage to escape. The Blowback announce a storming of Zoey's castle for the next day. Attempts by the Suits to intercept their communications fail, as the coordination happens inside the Hub, a virtual reality MMO game which even Zoey at 23 is too old to understand. Zoey insists on trying to solve the conflict through diplomacy, using Budd's large network of contacts. She and Echo go to a meeting with Blowback, discovering that it is directly run by Dirk Vikerness, Chobb's bodyguard and right-hand man. He attempts to kidnap the two women, but Zoey stabs him in the face, and they escape. With the confirmation of Chobb's involvement, the Suits prepare Zoey's estate for a siege. Lacking in manpower, they make a deal with the crime lord "Megaboss" Alonzo Dunn in exchange for backing him in an upcoming mayoral election.

At the announced hour, the attack does not come. Zoey's cat however goes missing, and the Blowback now plan a "victory feast". An attempt to rescue the cat in a military stealth helicopter procured by Andre leads them to kidnap one of the Blowback ringleaders, who turns out to be Chobb's teenage son Marti. The rivalry with Chobb now escalates into the likelihood of a city-wide war. Marti explains that not just the planning, but the entire "attack" on Zoey's estate took place inside the Hub: there was never any physical threat posed at all. Indeed, Zoey's cat turns up on his own. Marti also reveals that Tilley died of an assisted suicide, after which his organs were sold on the black market; Marti himself was one of the recipients. They let Marti go, but the public transgression was already made, and Titus' entire armed force converges on their location. Declaring the situation out of Will Blackwater's control, Zoey goes to talk to Titus Chobb again, this time on her own. She is attacked by Vikerness but is saved by bystanders, helping Zoey realize that her online haters don't represent the people in real life.

Titus Chobb insists that every recent action against Zoey was taken by Vikerness on his own and disavows him for trying to cover up the use of illegally obtained organs on the fly and without approval. He then explains his long-time rivalry with Zoey's late father, which culminated in Chobb sponsoring Molech, the man who wound up killing Arthur Livingston. Zoey offers to buy his private security company for a sum large enough for Chobb to purchase the controlling stake in the Hub, an economy the size of Germany. Seeing it as a chance to reconnect with his son, Chobb agrees. DeeDee, the niece of Megaboss Alonzo, impresses Zoey into agreeing to let her have the first non-bootleg Raiden implants. Later, Will Blackwater admits to Zoey that he saw Chobb as a major threat to their operations and had been laying the groundwork for a takeover. Tilley's unexpected death derailed his plans, which Blackwater knew Zoey would not approve of. He then let her connect the dots and implement the final stage on her own, believing it was her idea. Zoey realizes that Will does care about her a great deal, in his own roundabout way.

== Reception ==
The review by Stephanie Cohen-Perez praised the originality of the futuristic world, where the new technology leads both to more powerful weapons and more extravagant displays of consumerism. She complimented the biting commentary on important societal topics, writing that "from its title, David Wong's second installment in the adventures of heiress Zoey Ashe promises an unforgettable, bizarre and brain-bending storyline, and it does not disappoint."

Elizabeth Tabler's review positively relayed how the book does not shy away from uglier problems such as mental health of the protagonist. She underlined that despite the funny banter between Zoey and her team, "there is an undercurrent of sadness" because Zoey now has no friends and only interacts with her father's co-workers, her chance at normal life forever taken away. Tabler concluded that "if you are a fan of the slightly bizarre with a science-fiction bent to it, ... Zoey Punches the Future in the Dick is worth reading."

Jena Brown praised the novel's satire in her review, complimenting how it dives into heavy topics like power structure and the banality of evil by pulling them apart until they are distended into shades of grey. Describing the book as "a wild ride with unpredictable twists and turns" and "a brilliant spotlight, highlighting all the ways reliance on technology can go wrong", she expressed that the book ends on a surprisingly hopeful note.
