= Anna Machin =

British evolutionary anthropologist

- Education: University of Reading
- Known for: Fatherhood; Acheulean handaxes
- Scientific career
- Fields: Evolutionary anthropology; Archeology
- Workplaces: University of Oxford
- Thesis: The Acheulean handaxe: symmetry, function and early and middle Pleistocene hominin behaviour (2006)
- Doctoral advisors: Steven Mithen
- Website: annamachin.com

Anna Machin is a British evolutionary anthropologist at the Department of Experimental Psychology at Oxford University, England. She is the author of a book on fatherhood, The Life of Dad: The Making of a Modern Father, published in 2018.

== Education ==
Machin graduated with a B.A. in anthropology and English, followed in 1999 by an MSc in human evolution and behaviour from University College, London. In 2006, she obtained her PhD in archeology from the University of Reading.

== Career and research ==
After getting her PhD, Machin was a postdoctoral fellow working with Robin Dunbar from 2008 to 2014, after which she became a visiting academic while also pursuing a career as a freelance scientific writer and broadcaster.

=== Archeology ===
Within archeology, Machin has studied and commented on the symmetry, morphology, effectiveness, and sex appeal of Acheulean handaxes.

=== Attachment and love ===
Machin has done research on attachment and love between parents and children, between loving couples, and between best friends.

=== Fatherhood ===
As an evolutionary anthropologist, Machin believes that both mothers and fathers have been primed by evolution to parent their children. She has studied father-child relationships and takes the position that human fatherhood would not have developed unless the investment that fathers make in their children is vital for the survival of the species. She has concluded that fatherhood was fundamental to the development of humans and humanity, with fathers performing critical parenting tasks in coaching and educating their children.

Machin has also studied the expectations and reality of fatherhood, and systemic impediments to fathers' involvement in their children's lives.

=== In popular media ===
Machin has been interviewed and cited about fatherhood and love relationships by a variety of popular media outlets, including New Scientist, The Guardian, the BBC, The Daily Telegraph, Daily Mirror, Eltern, and Broadly.

=== Selected publications ===
- Machin, Anna Jane (14 June 2018). The Life of Dad: The Making of the Modern Father. Simon & Schuster. ISBN 978-1-4711-6140-7.
- Machin, Anna Jane; Hosfield, R. T.; Mithen, S. J. (2005). "Testing the functional utility of handaxe symmetry: Fallow deer butchery with replica handaxes" (PDF). Lithics: The Journal of the Lithic Studies Society. 26: 23–37. ISSN 0262-7817. ResearchGate 228527341.
- Machin, Anna Jane; Hosfield, R. T.; Mithen, S. J. (June 2007). "Why are some handaxes symmetrical? Testing the influence of handaxe morphology on butchery effectiveness" (PDF). Journal of Archaeological Science. 34 (6): 883–893. doi:10.1016/j.jas.2006.09.008.
- Machin, Anna Jane (September 2008). "Why handaxes just aren't that sexy: A response to Kohn & Mithen (1999)". Antiquity. 82 (317): 761–766. doi:10.1017/S0003598X00097362. ISSN 0003-598X.
- Machin, Anna Jane (February 2009). "The role of the individual agent in Acheulean biface variability: A multi-factorial model". Journal of Social Archaeology. 9 (1): 35–58. doi:10.1177/1469605308099370. ISSN 1469-6053.
- Machin, Anna Jane; Dunbar, Robin I. M. (January 2011). "The brain opioid theory of social attachment: a review of the evidence". Behaviour. 148 (9): 985–1025. doi:10.1163/000579511X596624. ISSN 0005-7959. JSTOR 23034206. Academia 48337288.
- Machin, Anna Jane; Dunbar, Robin I. M. (25 October 2013). "Sex and gender as factors in romantic partnerships and best friendships". Journal of Relationships Research. 4. doi:10.1017/jrr.2013.8. ISSN 1838-0956.
- Machin, Anna Jane (Spring 2015). "Mind the gap: The expectation and reality of involved fatherhood". Fathering: A Journal of Theory, Research, and Practice about Men as Fathers. 13 (1). Harriman, Tennessee: Men's Studies Press: 36–59. doi:10.3149/fth.1301.36 (inactive 26 October 2026). ISSN 1537-6680. EBSCOhost 109807963 ProQuest 1683082198.
- Pearce, Eiluned; Launay, Jacques; Machin, Anna Jane; Dunbar, Robin I. M. (2016). "Is group singing special? Health, well-being and social bonds in community-based adult education classes". Journal of Community & Applied Social Psychology. 26 (6): 518–533. doi:10.1002/casp.2278. ISSN 1052-9284. PMC 5113759.
- Machin, Anna Jane; Dunbar, Robin I. M. (2016). "Is Kinship a Schema? Moral Decisions and the Function of the Human Kin Naming System". Adaptive Human Behavior and Physiology. 2 (3): 195–219. doi:10.1007/s40750-015-0036-2. ISSN 2198-7335.
- Machin, Anna Jane (2022). Why We Love: The New Science Behind Our Closest Relationships. New York: Pegasus Books. ISBN 978-1-64313-922-7. OCLC 1259047388.

=== Popular media ===
- Anna Machin, Ask a grown-up: why do humans kiss?, The Guardian, 26 July 2014.
- Anna Machin, Top Tips for Dads on How Best to Bond with Baby, My Baba, 7 November 2018.
- Anna Machin, The marvel of the human dad, Aeon, 19 January 2019.
