= Size of groups, organizations, and communities =

Factor influencing social behavior

Size (the number of people involved) is an important characteristic of the groups, organizations, and communities in which social behavior occurs.

When only a few persons are interacting, adding just one more individual may make a big difference in how they relate. As an organization or community grows in size it is apt to experience tipping points where the way in which it operates needs to change. The complexity of large groupings is partly due to interrelated subgroups.

Herbert Thelen proposed a principle that for members of groups to have maximum motivation to perform, the number of members in each should be the smallest "in which it is possible to have represented at a functional level all the social and achievement skills required for the particular required activity."

== Dyads ==
Groups of two persons (called by many names: dybs, pairs, couples, duos, etc.) are important either while standing alone or as building blocks of larger groupings. An infant requires a caregiver in order to survive, so life begins in a pair relationship that is apt to influence later ones.

Pair relations can be trivial and fleeting (like that of a clerk and customer at a checkout stand) or multi-purpose and enduring (like a lifelong marriage). Unlike a larger group, though, which can replace lost members and last indefinitely, a dyad exists only as long as both members participate.

Pairing off is very common for several reasons. It is simpler to relate to one other person than to several at once. We are comfortable in dealing with someone who is similar to ourselves, and any two persons can usually find common traits or experiences to serve as "hook up points" between them. On the other hand, we are also fascinated by people who are different from us. Novelty, of course, wears off.

Differences can be the basis for long-term alliances when they are complementary. She can fix the lawn mower and he is a good cook; Gilbert writes the book and Sullivan composes the music. Topping all is that "game that two are playing", sexual mating, with its many and powerful effects on human affairs.

== Triads ==
Groups with three members (triads, trios, troikas, etc.) are hard to maintain. After all, it is easier to deal with one other person than with two. Besides, two of the people in a triad are apt to find it easier to relate to each other than to the other partner. That can motivate the neglected party to drop out of the group.

Where polygamy is practiced, a husband taking a second wife will often provide her with separate quarters so as to have two pair relationships instead of a contentious household of three adults. In polyamory, at least two types of relationships are observed: a "V" relationship, where one partner has a romantic relationship with both other members, and a triad, where everyone is involved romantically. Either situation may or may not prove to be satisfying and lasting.

In history, three leaders have sometimes attempted to share political power in a triumvirate, with little long-term success.

On the other hand, groups of three can be very stable if there is a leader and two followers, such as a family of a single parent and two children. Likewise, a subordinate may be related to two power-figures, e.g., an only child with two parents.

== Tetrads ==
With the notable exception of vocal and musical quartets, groups of four tend not to last very long. Two persons in the group are apt to find it more satisfying to relate to each other than to either of the others. If the other two feel left out, they have at least that in common. They may feel a need to counteract the advantage a pair has when acting together over an individual operating alone. The relationship becomes one of two pairs rather than an effective group of four members.

In decision-making groups the tendency to split two against two can lead to frustrating stalemates. Differences can be resolved more easily if the group starts out with three or five rather than four members.

On the other hand, a group of four can be stable if it depends upon unique contributions from each of its members. In a musical quartet each participant’s part is different and essential. The more experience the musicians have in playing together the better they can perform. Some such groups stay together for decades.

Stability can also result when there is one leader and three subordinates. A similar but short-lived pattern occurs at cocktail parties: studies of social gatherings find frequent clusters of one person talking and three listening.

== Even and odd sizes ==
As a group gets larger, adding another person has less effect on its characteristics. A consideration at least in smaller groups, though, is whether the number of members is even or odd. Doing things together is easy if all those involved agree on what to do, or if majority opinion is able to override objections without repelling the objectors. A group of six or eight members can split into two equal factions, so decision-making is not apt to be as easy as if the size were five, seven or nine. As groups get larger stalemates are less likely but still can be troublesome. If a group makes decisions by voting it can adopt a means of tie-breaking (requiring one vote more than 50% for a measure to be adopted, giving the presiding officer a tie-breaking vote, or deciding by coin toss).

Even-sized small groups often experience lower cohesion than odd-sized small groups.

== Characteristics of larger groups ==
As the size of a group increases:

- The number of possible person-to-person links (L) increases rapidly as the size of the group (N) increases (L = (N² - N) /2). In a four-member group there are six possible pairings; add a fifth member for each of the four to relate to and you have ten pairs. The number of possible two-person links in a group of twelve is 66.
- Need for leadership becomes more obvious. Certain things have to be done for a group to form and continue: people have to be motivated to come together and cooperate; goals must be set; tasks assigned, scheduled, and carried out; problems solved. A few people who trust each other and share an important purpose can sometimes do all of that in a spontaneous and equalitarian way. Large groups almost always depend on recognized leaders to manage operations.
- Diversity increases, providing more resources for problem solving but impeding communication and cooperation and making consensus more difficult to reach.
- Bureaucratic procedures tend to develop, such as assigning different tasks to different subgroups and adopting standard procedures.

=== Production teams ===
Many human activities are too big, difficult, or complex to be accomplished by a single person. At the same time, they may require such close coordination that if more than, say, a half dozen persons try to collaborate they get in each other's way, lose a common focus, and tend to work at cross purposes.

Our species has depended largely on subsistence provided by collaboration among members of the immediate family: a woman who bears, nurses, and looks after children (with aid and advice of her mother), and does chores consistent with those responsibilities; a man, who is free to range farther from the home base for food and materials and can do things that require extra strength or concentration; and the children providing whatever assistance is required of them as they grow more capable.

Deliberative bodies, such as legislatures, commissions, and advisory boards, discuss and vote on proposals. The work of researching and drafting the proposals is done sometimes by individuals but often by the collaboration of a small sub-group. Robert's Rules of Order is a common ruleset used to maintain order and productivity in groups.

Military operations are carried out by directing the efforts of a number of small, highly coordinated units that do the actual fighting, for example infantry units, gun crews, or bomber crews.

In many sports a team consists of five or six players. Baseball manages with the large number of nine because any given play involves only a few of teammates. American football requires coordinating a team of eleven players. The team huddles before an offensive play to let the players know what they need to do so that the ball-handler doesn't have to keep track of each of them.

Much economic activity (farming, mining, production, sales, etc.) is carried out by small groups, each of whose members work together under the supervision of a first-line manager. (See team.)

=== Advisory, policy-making, and fact-finding groups ===
Important decisions often require more expertise and sources of information than is possessed by any individual. Historically a king has had a council of courtiers, a Pope a College of Cardinals, a corporation a board of directors. Executives or legislative bodies appoint advisory committees, policy-making boards, and fact-finding commissions.

All these groups benefit from having members who are diverse in their information sources, talents and experience. This kind of group is usually bigger than a production team. The more complex the issues the more different viewpoints will be needed. At the same time practical considerations dictate how large the group can be. Once you have a couple of dozen members, adding another is not likely to add much to the information available from the others. At about that size there is no longer enough time at meetings to hear from everyone, and participants can't be seated so that they can easily see and listen to each other.

== Intimate communities ==
An intimate community is one in which some members recognize and are recognized by all of the others, and most of the members recognize and are recognized by many of the others. This is in contrast to (usually larger) communities where members are known and interact mostly within their own subgroup, such as neighborhood, department, or occupation. The contrast between the two types is illustrated by comparing hamlet with town, military company with battalion, parish church with diocese, or a country school with a huge urban school district.

Intimate communities seldom have more than about 150 members. Dunbar's number is based on studies of social animals, which have shown a correlation between the typical frontal brain capacity the members of a species and the maximum size of the groups in which they live. The number of relationships the human brain can handle is large but not unlimited.

In a small church the minister typically knows everyone, and the congregation is “one big family.” It is not considered easy to grow beyond 150 members, however, because that requires (besides a bigger building) augmenting the minister with paid staff, systematically recruiting and training volunteers, and dealing with increased numbers and diversity by developing specialized groups and programs.

Educators are advocating subdividing large schools into smaller units so that staff can know all the students and there will be more feeling of belonging, support and continuity.

== Urban and metropolitan areas ==
As settlements grow in population they increase in density, complexity, diversity, and administrative apparatus. The character of community life is enough different at different ranges of size that distinctive terms have developed (from smaller to larger): hamlet, village, town, city, metropolis, megalopolis. There is, however, little agreement on exactly where in the growth process a place passes from one of these categories to the next.

It has been observed that the population of a city is roughly inversely proportional to its rank in size among the urban areas of its economic region (Zipf's law).

== See also ==
- Kinship – Web of human social relationships
- Sippe – Kind of a kinship group
