= Jonathan Ahdout =

American actor

- Born: March 18, 1989 (age 37); Santa Monica, California, U.S.
- Education: University of Southern California (BA, BS)
- Occupation: Actor
- Years active: 2003–present

Jonathan Ahdout (Persian: جاناتن آهدوت, born March 18, 1989) is an American actor known for his role in House of Sand and Fog.

== Early life and education ==
Ahdout was born in Santa Monica, California on March 18, 1989. His parents are Yahya Ahdout and Jacqueline Hayempour, Iranian Jews who lived in Pakistan and Israel before immigrating to the United States in 1982. He attended Sinai Akiba Academy and Harvard-Westlake School. He earned a Bachelor of Arts in film production and Bachelor of Science in business administration and management from University of Southern California.

== Career ==
Ahdout's acting career started with a role in the film House of Sand and Fog, in which he played the part of Esmail Behrani. In 2005, he played the part of Behrooz Araz in the television series 24. In House of Sand and Fog, his character was the son of Shohreh Aghdashloo's character; to his and Aghdashloo's surprise, the same was true when they were cast in 24. In 2007, he appeared in an episode of The Unit.

== Filmography ==
=== Film ===
Year	Title	Role	Notes
2003	House of Sand and Fog	Esmail	
2005	American Gun	Ike	
2009	The Indian and the Samurai	Anil	Short Film
2010	Little Blue Pill	Dr. Hrundi Bhatnagar	

=== Television ===
Year	Title	Role	Notes
2005	24	Behrooz Araz	12 episodes
2007	The Unit	Shepherd	Episode: "Johnny B. Good"
2017	Ultimate Ultimate	Jonny	

== Personal life ==
Ahdout resides in Brentwood, Los Angeles with his parents and siblings.
