= Grooming, Gossip and the Evolution of Language =

1996 book by Robin Dunbar

- Author: Robin Dunbar
- Language: English
- Subject: Origin of language
- Publisher: Harvard University Press
- Publication date: 1996
- Publication place: United States
- Media type: Print (Hardcover and Paperback)
- Pages: 230 pp.
- ISBN: 978-0-674-36334-2

Grooming, Gossip and the Evolution of Language is a 1996 book by the anthropologist Robin Dunbar, in which the author argues that language evolved from social grooming. He further suggests that a stage of this evolution was the telling of gossip, an argument supported by the observation that language is adapted for storytelling.

== Thesis ==
Dunbar argues that gossip does for group-living humans what manual grooming does for other primates—it allows individuals to service their relationships and thus maintain their alliances on the basis of the principle: if you scratch my back, I'll scratch yours. Dunbar argues that as humans began living in increasingly larger social groups, the task of manually grooming all one's friends and acquaintances became so time-consuming as to be unaffordable. In response to this problem, Dunbar argues that humans invented 'a cheap and ultra-efficient form of grooming'—vocal grooming. To keep allies happy, one now needs only to 'groom' them with low-cost vocal sounds, servicing multiple allies simultaneously while keeping both hands free for other tasks. Vocal grooming then evolved gradually into vocal language—initially in the form of 'gossip'. Dunbar's hypothesis seems to be supported by the fact that the structure of language shows adaptations to the function of narration in general.

== Criticism ==
The book has been criticised on the grounds that since words are so cheap, Dunbar's "vocal grooming" would fall short in amounting to an honest signal. Further, the book provides no compelling story for how meaningless vocal grooming sounds might become syntactical speech. A further criticism is that the theory does nothing to explain the crucial transition from vocal grooming—the production of pleasing but meaningless sounds—to the cognitive complexities of syntactical speech.
