= John Dies at the End =

2007 novel by Jason Pargin

- Cover of the Permuted Press edition, now out of print
- Author: Jason Pargin
- Language: English
- Genre: Horror, comedy
- Publisher: Permuted Press
- Publication date: August 15, 2007
- Publication place: United States
- Media type: e-Book, print
- ISBN: 978-0-9789707-6-5
- OCLC: 186537812
- Followed by: This Book Is Full of Spiders

John Dies at the End is a cosmic Lovecraftian horror novel by Jason Pargin, under the pseudonym David Wong. It was first published online as a webserial beginning in 2001, then as an edited manuscript in 2004, and a printed paperback in 2007, published by Permuted Press. An estimated 70,000 people read the free online versions before they were removed in September 2008. Thomas Dunne Books published the story with additional material as a hardcover on September 29, 2009. The book was followed by four sequels, This Book Is Full of Spiders in 2012, What The Hell Did I Just Read in 2017, If This Book Exists, You're in the Wrong Universe in 2022, and There Are No Giant Crabs in This Novel: A Novel of Giant Crabs in 2026. A film adaptation by Don Coscarelli was released in 2012.

== Plot ==
David and John are a pair of paranormal investigators who live in an unnamed Midwestern town (referred to in the novel as "Undisclosed"). Dave meets reporter Arnie in a local restaurant and recounts the origin of his and John's unusual abilities.

The main story begins with David and John at a party, where John is performing with his band, Three Arm Sally. David leaves the party early after a confrontation with an "amateur magician" who seemed to have real supernatural powers, leaving him shaken. David goes home with an Irish Setter named Molly, which seems to have selected him as her new owner. David is awakened in the middle of the night by a call from John, asking that he come save him from something in his apartment. David meets up with John at his apartment and saves John from a "monster" that David can't see. They then go to Denny's, where John reveals that he has taken a drug known as "soy sauce". John shows David a syringe containing the drug, which he was given by the magician, who told John his name is "Robert Marley". David pockets the syringe. Later, David accidentally injects himself with the drug in his pocket and begins to feel the effects.

Local police detective Lawrence Appleton informs David that everyone from the party except himself are either dead or missing, which turns out not to be true. While David is being interrogated, Appleton and David are informed that John has died in the other room, causing Appleton to leave David alone in the interrogation room. Mysteriously, David receives a call from John urging him to escape custody in the chaos that has ensued from him flatlining in the other room. After a brief fight with a demon masquerading as an officer, David follows the instructions of the John on the phone to go to the trailer home of Robert Marley. While there, David sees a TV displaying the last moments of Robert Marley: he explodes into a massive swarm of flying, wingless bugs that look like grains of rice. These bugs then fly over to someone else that came from the party and dig into them, apparently possessing them. Appleton arrives shortly after David to burn down the trailer, gripped with the desire to purge the town of the evil he believes has come. He leaves David for dead after shooting him in the chest with a defective bullet, then leaves. David is rescued by Molly driving his car through the wall of the trailer. Shortly after, Molly begins to "speak" in the voice of John, which urges David to go to Vegas to seek out Albert Marconi.

David goes home to wash up and change clothes. After leaving the shower, David finds the man who had been possessed by the bugs that were once in Marley. He/it tells David to call him Shitload because "there's a shitload of us in here." After surviving multiple gunshots, Shitload kidnaps David, who is knocked unconscious after Shitload repeatedly punches him in the balls. David wakes up in the back of a liquor truck with John and other survivors of the party and they seem to be headed to the Luxor Hotel in Las Vegas to meet with Albert Marconi, an expert in the paranormal. En route to Las Vegas, Detective Appleton rescues the group from Shitload. Shortly after, he explodes into a swarm of the white bugs, which possess one of the other survivors, forcing David to kill and burn their body.

A climactic battle scene takes place at the Luxor and involves many strange scorpion monsters and a portal into what is apparently Hell that unleashes several entities called Shadow People. Marconi closes the portal, and John and David return home and resume their lives.

One year later, Dave and John begin investigating various strange phenomena, all caused by the Shadow Men. David alone is haunted by messages from a "Korrok," who harbors seeming ill will towards David, and is somehow orchestrating much of the phenomena. Eventually, David and John are called to the home of Molly's previous owner and one of the survivors who died in the Luxor, "Big" Jim Sullivan, to investigate the disappearance of Jim's sister, Amy. Amy disappeared from behind a locked door with no other entrances. After Amy reappears, David and John take more soy sauce to gain the supernatural awareness that they feel they need to confront the source of the Shadow Men and stop them for good. They then build a bomb, which is accidentally eaten by Molly. After tracking the Shadow Men to an abandoned mall, John and Dave are transported to another dimension, where they are greeted by followers of a godlike being called Korrok, who commands the Shadow Men in a bid to conquer all possible universes for consumption and amusement via acts of mass genocide and torture. They are informed that, through their use of the Soy Sauce, they are now the chosen vectors through which the Shadow Men will invade their world. Escaping their captors, the two flee with Molly just as the bomb detonates.

An incredulous Arnie refuses to believe Dave, even after being shown one of the monsters the Shadow Men summoned. After Arnie tells a story about his younger years of being a reporter where a cop called him a nigger, David realizes that Arnie, whom he sees as a white man, must be manifesting as a ghost. David reveals the real Arnie dead in the trunk of Arnie's rental car. Arnie panics and disappears.

In an epilogue, John and Dave find another dimensional portal inhabited by members of a paramilitary organization, who tell the two friends they are chosen ones who will save them. Annoyed, John and Dave leave, and watch as a group of teenagers travel through the portal and save the dimension.

== Characters ==
- David Wong: Author surrogate and the novel's protagonist. Dave narrates the novel from the first-person perspective. Dave is self-conscious and sarcastic, thus his narration is unreliable as the truth (he says he has been "mostly" honest with Arnie, and thus the reader). Dave is a slacker who works various minimum-wage jobs in his local town; during the timeline of the story he works at a video rental store.
- John: Long-time best friend of Dave. John is frequently under the influence of various drugs, and Dave's need to rescue John from various difficult situations propels the plot forward. His band is playing at the party that opens the main storyline.
- Molly: Molly is David's adoptive dog, an "Irish rust dog", whose tags indicate she previously belonged to the Sullivan family. Dave finds Molly at the party at the beginning of the main storyline. When Dave tries to return the dog, they refuse to receive it, and it follows Dave around for most of the story.
- Arnie Blondestone: A journalist investigating paranormal affairs, his interview with Dave provides a framing story for the main events of the novel.
- Robert Marley: A drug dealer present at the party at the outset of the story, he provides a drug known as "soy sauce" that either kills its users or gives them supernatural powers.
- Jennifer Lopez, "Big" Jim Sullivan, Fred Chu: Three party-goers who were all present at the party at the start of the story that sets the plot in motion. The three of them join John and Dave on the trek to Las Vegas in Book 1. "Big" Jim and Fred are killed in the events, while Jennifer (whom Dave has had a crush on since high school) ends up dating Dave for a while during the period between the two main storylines.
- Amy Sullivan: Timid sister of "Big" Jim Sullivan. She is missing her left hand stemming from an accident that killed her parents. Towards the end and in later novels Amy is dating David.
- Detective Lawrence Appleton: Detective in the Undisclosed Police Department, he starts investigating the deaths of several of the party goers, but becomes obsessed with the case, and changes from an investigator to trying to actively stop the evil that is operating in Undisclosed. He reminds Dave of a famous African-American actor, which Dave mistakenly thinks is Morgan Freeman.
- Doctor Albert Marconi: A former priest, and current lecturer on Paranormal Activities, he acts as an advisor of sorts to Dave and John.
- Danny Wexler: Local sportscaster whose possession by The Shadow Men provides the inciting incident in Book 2.
- Krissy Lovelace: Danny's neighbor who initiates the main investigation in Book 2.
- Korrok: Believed to be an evil deity worshiped by several different cultures in human history, Korrok serves as the novel's major antagonist, with many of the demons encountered by David and John throughout the novel acting as his servants. Korrok is depicted in many ways, both physical and metaphorical.
- "Shitload": One of Korrok's supernatural minions. Shitload's natural form consists of a swarm of small, white insectoids comparable to rods described in cryptozoological theories.

== Reception ==
Reviewer Bryan Gatchell considered it "a horror novel parody," saying, "The story combined the horror of the writings of H. P. Lovecraft and the surrealism of Heironymus [sic] Bosch painting with the early 20s (i.e., their age) asininity of its two main protagonists, David Wong and John... [T]hey can see things no other human can see such as shadow men, demons, floating worms, obscene fast food murals, ghost doors, men observing them through the television and dog-sized, wig-wearing, scorpion-like creatures... Wong is much more at home when it comes to the humorous aspects of the story... Strangely enough, the best moment of the novel has neither to do with horror (in the traditional sense) or humor. The novel becomes the most gripping when David describes a violent incident as a high school student. The rest of the novel is amusing, but at this moment, the novel breaks away from its jokey Internet origins and seems to come into its own as a genuinely good book."

The book received a positive review in The Guardian, with reviewer Eric Brown comparing it to the works of Philip K. Dick, Kurt Vonnegut and Hunter S. Thompson and writing "it may be a farrago of nonsense, but it's also unputdownable thanks to great narrative pace and its pair of likeable layabouts".

A review in Publishers Weekly was positive, saying "the book's smart take on fear manages to tap into readers' existential dread on one page, then have them laughing the next".

A review in Kirkus Reviews criticized the writing as "clunky" but ultimately praised the book, concluding "when it’s funny, it's laugh-out-loud funny, yet when the situation calls for chills, it provides them in spades".

Sandra Scholes, writing a featured review on SF Site recommended the book, stating "for those who like to delve into the realms of the unreal and offbeat, this is a really good one".

== Sequels ==
A sequel, This Book Is Full of Spiders, was published on October 2, 2012. An early draft of the novel was shared online under the title, John and Dave and the Temple of X'al'naa'thuthuthu, however it was never formally published and is considered to be a rough draft of the sequel novel. In the novel, Dave works to stop an invasion of interdimensional spiders hijacking people’s bodies, spiders that only he and John can see.

A third book in the series was released on October 3, 2017, under the title What the Hell Did I Just Read. This novel follows Dave, John, and Amy as they attempt to solve the abduction of a little girl by a mysterious shapeshifter, all while dealing with conspiracy and general lunacy.

The fourth book in the series, If This Book Exists, You're in the Wrong Universe, was released in October 2022. This book was released under Wong's real name, Jason Pargin; additionally, all previous books were reprinted and republished under the authors real name. This novel sees Dave, John, and Amy battle a cult of teenagers attempting to break reality by making sacrifices to a children's toy.

The fifth book, There Are No Giant Crabs in This Novel: A Novel of Giant Crabs, was published in November 2026.

== Film adaptation ==
Don Coscarelli purchased film rights to the book; and subsequently wrote and directed the film adaptation.

Filming began on October 21, 2010. The movie stars Paul Giamatti as Arnie Blondestone and Clancy Brown as Dr. Marconi, with Giamatti also helping to produce. Actors Chase Williamson and Rob Mayes play the lead roles of Dave and John, respectively.

The movie premiered at the 2012 Sundance Film Festival on January 24, 2012 and was released as an independent theatrical film the following day.
