= Thomas Dunne Books =

Defunct American publishing imprint

- Parent company: St. Martin's Press (Macmillan Publishers)
- Founded: 1986; 40 years ago
- Country of origin: United States
- Headquarters location: Flatiron Building, New York City
- Key people: Thomas Dunne (Publisher)
- Publication types: Books
- Fiction genres: Contemporary, Mainstream, Mystery, Suspense
- No. of employees: 4
- Official website: Thomas Dunne Books

Thomas Dunne Books was an imprint of St. Martin's Press, which is a division of Macmillan Publishers. From 1986 until April 2020, it published popular trade fiction and nonfiction.

== History ==
The imprint signed David Irving, a scholar, for a Joseph Goebbels biography in 1996 but had to drop the book when it was found out that Irving was a Holocaust denier for having links to Institute for Historical Review, "the literary center of the United States Holocaust-denial movement."

In October 1999, St. Martin's Press recalled a Dunne book, Fortunate Son: George W. Bush and the Making of an American President, and destroyed them after various incidents about the author, J. H. Hatfield, surfaced. The incidents were that he had served prison time for a car-bombing attempt on his former boss's life and that he included an anonymous accusation about Bush. A St. Martin's executive editor resigned in protest over the publication. In November, Dunne editors stopped attending St. Martin editorial meetings and started their own.

In June 2016, PublishersLunch announced that Thomas Dunne Books had been downsized to four employees.

In April 2020, St. Martin's Press eliminated the imprint as part of "implementing a job reduction action and hiring freeze" due to economic struggles caused by the COVID-19 pandemic.

== Authors ==
- Jesse Slattery The Juliet Effect Library of Congress Cataloging-in-Publication Data: Slattery, Jesse. The Juliet Effect. 1. Title. PS3569.L.266J85 1987 813'.54 87-16142 ISBN 0-312-01053-2
- James MacGregor Burns
- J.P. Donleavy
- Jeff Hertzberg and Zoë François
- Joe Haldeman (The Forever War)
- Homer Hickam
- Bobby Knight
- Ralph Nader
- Paul Beatty
- Michael Palin and the members of Monty Python
- Frederik Pohl
- Judd Trichter
- Bernie Sanders (Our Revolution: A Future to Believe In)
- William Shatner
- Jincy Willett
- David Wong (John Dies at the End)
- Viv Albertine
- John Hart (author)
- Steve Hamilton (author)
- D.C.A. Hillman, PhD (author) (The Chemical Muse: Drug Use and the Roots of Western Civilization)

=== Macmillan Entertainment ===
Macmillan Films (MF) was launched by Thomas Dunne Books in October 2010. It produced the docudrama series Gangland Undercover based on the book Vagos, Mongols, and Outlaws: My Infiltration of America's Deadliest Biker Gangs, by Charles Falco and Kerrie Droban, which the imprint published in 2013.

Macmillan Films was renamed Macmillan Entertainment. As of April 2020, the division's web site listed no staff, products in development, or available properties.
