= Inclusive fitness =

Measure of evolutionary success

Inclusive fitness is a conceptual framework in evolutionary biology first defined by W. D. Hamilton in 1964. It is primarily used to aid the understanding of how social traits are expected to evolve in structured populations. It involves partitioning an individual's expected fitness returns into two distinct components: direct fitness returns, the component of a focal individual’s fitness that is independent of who it interacts with socially, and indirect fitness returns, the component that is dependent on who it interacts with socially. The direct component of an individual's fitness is often called its personal fitness, while an individual’s direct and indirect fitness components taken together are often called its inclusive fitness.

Under an inclusive fitness framework, direct fitness returns are realised through the offspring a focal individual produces independent of who it interacts with, while indirect fitness returns are realised by adding up all the effects our focal individual has on the (number of) offspring produced by those it interacts with weighted by the relatedness of our focal individual to those it interacts with. This can be visualised in a sexually reproducing system (assuming identity by descent) by saying that an individual's own child, who carries one half of that individual's genes, represents one offspring equivalent. A sibling's child, who will carry one-quarter of the individual's genes, will then represent 1/2 offspring equivalent, and so on (see coefficient of relationship).

Neighbour-modulated fitness is the conceptual inverse of inclusive fitness. Where inclusive fitness calculates an individual’s indirect fitness component by summing the fitness that focal individual receives through modifying the productivities of those it interacts with (its neighbours), neighbour-modulated fitness instead calculates it by summing the effects an individual’s neighbours have on that focal individual’s productivity. When taken over an entire population, these two frameworks give functionally equivalent results. Hamilton’s rule is a particularly important result in the fields of evolutionary ecology and behavioral ecology that follows naturally from the partitioning of fitness into direct and indirect components, as given by inclusive and neighbour-modulated fitness, revealing how the average trait value of a population is expected to evolve under the assumption of small mutational steps.

Kin selection is a well known case whereby inclusive fitness effects can influence the evolution of social behaviours. Kin selection relies on positive relatedness (driven by identity by descent) to enable individuals who positively influence the fitness of those they interact with at a cost to their own personal fitness, to outcompete individuals employing more selfish strategies. It is thought to be one of the primary mechanisms underlying the evolution of altruistic behaviour, alongside the less prevalent reciprocity (see also reciprocal altruism), and to be of particular importance in enabling the evolution of eusociality among other forms of group living. Inclusive fitness has also been used to explain the existence of spiteful behaviour, where individuals negatively influence the fitness of those they interact with at a cost to their own personal fitness.

Inclusive fitness and neighbour-modulated fitness are both frameworks that leverage the individual as the unit of selection. It is from this that the gene-centered view of evolution emerged: a perspective that has facilitated much of the work done into the evolution of conflict (examples include parent-offspring conflict, interlocus sexual conflict, and intragenomic conflict).

== Overview ==
The British evolutionary biologist W. D. Hamilton showed mathematically that, because other members of a population may share one's genes, a gene can also increase its evolutionary success by indirectly promoting the reproduction and survival of other individuals who also carry that gene. This is variously called "kin theory", "kin selection theory" or "inclusive fitness theory". The most obvious category of such individuals is close genetic relatives, and where these are concerned, the application of inclusive fitness theory is often more straightforwardly treated via the narrower kin selection theory. Hamilton's theory, alongside reciprocal altruism, is considered one of the two primary mechanisms for the evolution of social behaviors in natural species and a major contribution to the field of sociobiology, which holds that some behaviors can be dictated by genes, and therefore can be passed to future generations and may be selected for as the organism evolves.

Belding's ground squirrel provides an example; it gives an alarm call to warn its local group of the presence of a predator. By emitting the alarm, it gives its own location away, putting itself in more danger. In the process, however, the squirrel may protect its relatives within the local group (along with the rest of the group). Therefore, if the effect of the trait influencing the alarm call typically protects the other squirrels in the immediate area, it will lead to the passing on of more copies of the alarm call trait in the next generation than the squirrel could leave by reproducing on its own. In such a case natural selection will increase the trait that influences giving the alarm call, provided that a sufficient fraction of the shared genes include the gene(s) predisposing to the alarm call.

Synalpheus regalis, a eusocial shrimp, is an organism whose social traits meet the inclusive fitness criterion. The larger defenders protect the young juveniles in the colony from outsiders. By ensuring the young's survival, the genes will continue to be passed on to future generations.

Inclusive fitness is more generalized than strict kin selection, which requires that the shared genes are identical by descent. Inclusive fitness is not limited to cases where "kin" ('close genetic relatives') are involved.

== Hamilton's rule ==
Hamilton's rule is most easily derived in the framework of neighbour-modulated fitness, where the fitness of a focal individual is considered to be modulated by the actions of its neighbours. This is the inverse of inclusive fitness where we consider how a focal individual modulates the fitness of its neighbours. However, taken over the entire population, these two approaches are equivalent to each other so long as fitness remains linear in trait value. A simple derivation of Hamilton's rule can be gained via the Price equation as follows. If an infinite population is assumed, such that any non-selective effects can be ignored, the Price equation can be written as:

$$\bar{w}\Delta{\bar{z}} = \operatorname{cov}(w_i, z_i)$$

Where $z$ represents trait value and $w$ represents fitness, either taken for an individual $i$ or averaged over the entire population. If fitness is linear in trait value, the fitness for an individual $i$ can be written as:

$$w_i = \alpha + (-c) z_i + b z_n$$

Where $\alpha$ is the component of an individual's fitness which is independent of trait value, $-c$ parameterizes the effect of individual $i$'s phenotype on its own fitness (written negative, by convention, to represent a fitness cost), $z_n$ is the average trait value of individual $i$'s neighbours, and $b$ parameterizes the effect of individual $i$'s neighbours on its fitness (written positive, by convention, to represent a fitness benefit). Substituting into the Price equation then gives:

$$\bar{w} \Delta{\bar{z}} = \operatorname{cov}(\alpha -c z_i + b z_{n}, z_i) = \operatorname{cov}(\alpha, z_i) - c\operatorname{cov}(z_i, z_i) + b \operatorname{cov}(z_n, z_i)$$

Since $\alpha$ by definition does not covary with $z_i$, this rearranges to:

$$\Delta{\bar{z}} = \frac{\operatorname{cov}(z_i, z_i)}{\bar{w}}\left(b\frac{\operatorname{cov}(z_n, z_i)}{\operatorname{cov}(z_i, z_i)} - c\right)$$

Since $\frac{\operatorname{cov}(z_i, z_i)}{\bar{w}} = \frac{\operatorname{var}(z_i)}{\bar{w}}$ this term must, by definition, be greater than 0. This is because variances can never be negative, and negative mean fitness is undefined (if mean fitness is 0 the population has crashed, similarly 0 variance would imply a monomorphic population, in both cases a change in mean trait value is impossible). It can then be said that that mean trait value will increase ($\Delta{\bar{z}} > 0$) when:

$$b\frac{\operatorname{cov}(z_n, z_i)}{\operatorname{cov}(z_i, z_i)} - c > 0$$

or

$$r b > c$$

Giving Hamilton's rule, where relatedness ($r$) is a regression coefficient of the form $\frac{\operatorname{cov}(z_n, z_i)}{\operatorname{cov}(z_i, z_i)}$, or $\frac{\operatorname{cov}(z_n, z_i)}{\operatorname{var}(z_i)}$. Relatedness here can vary between a value of 1 (only interacting with individuals of the same trait value) and -1 (only interacting with individuals of a [most] different trait value), and will be 0 when all individuals in the population interact with equal likelihood.

Fitness in practice, however, does not tend to be linear in trait value -this would imply an increase to an infinitely large trait value being just as valuable to fitness as a similar increase to a very small trait value. Consequently, to apply Hamilton's rule to biological systems the conditions under which fitness can be approximated to being linear in trait value must first be found. There are two main methods used to approximate fitness as being linear in trait value; performing a partial regression with respect to both the focal individual's trait value and its neighbours average trait value, or taking a first order Taylor series approximation of fitness with respect to trait value. Performing a partial regression requires minimal assumptions, but only provides a statistical relationship as opposed to a mechanistic one, and cannot be extrapolated beyond the dataset that it was generated from. Linearizing via a Taylor series approximation, however, provides a powerful mechanistic relationship (see also causal model), but requires the assumption that evolution proceeds in sufficiently small mutational steps that the difference in trait value between an individual and its neighbours is close to 0 (in accordance with Fisher's geometric model): although in practice this approximation can often still retain predictive power under larger mutational steps.

As a first order approximation (linear in trait value), Hamilton's rule can only inform about how the mean trait value in a population is expected to change (directional selection). It contains no information about how the variance in trait value is expected to change (disruptive selection). As such it cannot be considered sufficient to determine evolutionary stability, even when Hamilton's rule predicts no change in trait value. This is because disruptive selection terms, and subsequent conditions for evolutionary branching, must instead be obtained from second order approximations (quadratic in trait value) of fitness.

Gardner et al. (2007) suggest that Hamilton's rule can be applied to multi-locus models, but that it should be done at the point of interpreting theory, rather than the starting point of enquiry. They suggest that one should "use standard population genetics, game theory, or other methodologies to derive a condition for when the social trait of interest is favoured by selection and then use Hamilton's rule as an aid for conceptualizing this result". It is now becoming increasingly popular to use adaptive dynamics approaches to gain selection conditions which are directly interpretable with respect to Hamilton's rule.

== Altruism ==
The concept serves to explain how natural selection can perpetuate altruism. If there is an "altruism gene" (or complex of genes) that influences an organism's behaviour to be helpful and protective of relatives and their offspring, this behaviour also increases the proportion of the altruism gene in the population, because relatives are likely to share genes with the altruist due to common descent. In formal terms, if such a complex of genes arises, Hamilton's rule (rbc) specifies the selective criteria (in terms of cost, benefit and relatedness) for such a trait to increase in frequency in the population. Hamilton noted that inclusive fitness theory does not by itself predict that a species will necessarily evolve such altruistic behaviours, since an opportunity or context for interaction between individuals is a more primary and necessary requirement in order for any social interaction to occur in the first place. As Hamilton put it, "Altruistic or selfish acts are only possible when a suitable social object is available. In this sense behaviours are conditional from the start." In other words, while inclusive fitness theory specifies a set of necessary criteria for the evolution of altruistic traits, it does not specify a sufficient condition for their evolution in any given species. More primary necessary criteria include the existence of gene complexes for altruistic traits in gene pool, as mentioned above, and especially that "a suitable social object is available", as Hamilton noted. The American evolutionary biologist Paul W. Sherman gives a fuller discussion of Hamilton's latter point:

To understand any species' pattern of nepotism, two questions about individuals' behavior must be considered: (1) what is reproductively ideal?, and (2) what is socially possible? With his formulation of "inclusive fitness," Hamilton suggested a mathematical way of answering (1). Here I suggest that the answer to (2) depends on demography, particularly its spatial component, dispersal, and its temporal component, mortality. Only when ecological circumstances affecting demography consistently make it socially possible will nepotism be elaborated according to what is reproductively ideal. For example, if dispersing is advantageous and if it usually separates relatives permanently, as in many birds, on the rare occasions when nestmates or other kin live in proximity, they will not preferentially cooperate. Similarly, nepotism will not be elaborated among relatives that have infrequently coexisted in a population's or a species' evolutionary history. If an animal's life history characteristicsusually preclude the existence of certain relatives, that is if kin are usually unavailable, the rare coexistence of such kin will not occasion preferential treatment. For example, if reproductives generally die soon after zygotes are formed, as in many temperate zone insects, the unusual individual that survives to interact with its offspring is not expected to behave parentally.

The occurrence of sibling cannibalism in several species underlines the point that inclusive fitness theory should not be understood to simply predict that genetically related individuals will inevitably recognize and engage in positive social behaviours towards genetic relatives. Only in species that have the appropriate traits in their gene pool, and in which individuals typically interacted with genetic relatives in the natural conditions of their evolutionary history, will social behaviour potentially be elaborated, and consideration of the evolutionarily typical demographic composition of grouping contexts of that species is thus a first step in understanding how selection pressures upon inclusive fitness have shaped the forms of its social behaviour. Richard Dawkins gives a simplified illustration:

If families [genetic relatives] happen to go around in groups, this fact provides a useful rule of thumb for kin selection: 'care for any individual you often see'."

Evidence from a variety of species including primates and other social mammals suggests that contextual cues (such as familiarity) are often significant proximate mechanisms mediating the expression of altruistic behaviour, regardless of whether the participants are always in fact genetic relatives or not. This is nevertheless evolutionarily stable since selection pressure acts on typical conditions, not on the rare occasions where actual genetic relatedness differs from that normally encountered. Inclusive fitness theory thus does not imply that organisms evolve to direct altruism towards genetic relatives. Many popular treatments do however promote this interpretation, as illustrated in a review:

[M]any misunderstandings persist. In many cases, they result from conflating "coefficient of relatedness" and "proportion of shared genes," which is a short step from the intuitively appealing—but incorrect—interpretation that "animals tend to be altruistic toward those with whom they share a lot of genes." These misunderstandings don't just crop up occasionally; they are repeated in many writings, including undergraduate psychology textbooks—most of them in the field of social psychology, within sections describing evolutionary approaches to altruism. (Park 2007, p860)

Such misunderstandings of inclusive fitness' implications for the study of altruism, even amongst professional biologists utilizing the theory, are widespread, prompting prominent theorists to regularly attempt to highlight and clarify the mistakes. An example of attempted clarification is West et al. (2010):

In his original papers on inclusive fitness theory, Hamilton pointed out a sufficiently high relatedness to favour altruistic behaviours could accrue in two ways—kin discrimination or limited dispersal. There is a huge theoretical literature on the possible role of limited dispersal, as well as experimental evolution tests of these models. However, despite this, it is still sometimes claimed that kin selection requires kin discrimination. Furthermore, a large number of authors appear to have implicitly or explicitly assumed that kin discrimination is the only mechanism by which altruistic behaviours can be directed towards relatives... [T]here is a huge industry of papers reinventing limited dispersal as an explanation for cooperation. The mistakes in these areas seem to stem from the incorrect assumption that kin selection or indirect fitness benefits require kin discrimination (misconception 5), despite the fact that Hamilton pointed out the potential role of limited dispersal in his earliest papers on inclusive fitness theory.

== Green-beard effect ==
As well as interactions in reliable contexts of genetic relatedness, altruists may also have some way to recognize altruistic behaviour in unrelated individuals and be inclined to support them. As Dawkins points out in The Selfish Gene and The Extended Phenotype, this must be distinguished from the green-beard effect.

The green-beard effect is the act of a gene (or several closely linked genes), that:

1. Produces a phenotype.
2. Allows recognition of that phenotype in others.
3. Causes the individual to preferentially treat other individuals with the same gene.

The green-beard effect was originally a thought experiment by Hamilton in his publications on inclusive fitness in 1964, although it hadn't yet been observed. As of today, it has been observed in few species. Its rarity is probably due to its susceptibility to 'cheating' whereby individuals can gain the trait that confers the advantage, without the altruistic behaviour. This normally would occur via the crossing over of chromosomes which happens frequently, often rendering the green-beard effect a transient state. However, Wang et al. has shown in one of the species where the effect is common (fire ants), recombination cannot occur due to a large genetic transversion, essentially forming a supergene. This, along with homozygote inviability at the green-beard loci allows for the extended maintenance of the green-beard effect.

Equally, cheaters may not be able to invade the green-beard population if the mechanism for preferential treatment and the phenotype are intrinsically linked. In budding yeast (Saccharomyces cerevisiae), the dominant allele FLO1 is responsible for flocculation (self-adherence between cells) which helps protect them against harmful substances such as ethanol. While 'cheater' yeast cells occasionally find their way into the biofilm-like substance that is formed from FLO1 expressing yeast, they cannot invade as the FLO1 expressing yeast will not bind to them in return, and thus the phenotype is intrinsically linked to the preference.

== Parent–offspring conflict and optimization ==
Early writings on inclusive fitness theory (including Hamilton 1964) used K in place of B/C. Thus Hamilton's rule was expressed as

$K> 1/r$ is the necessary and sufficient condition for selection for altruism.

Where B is the gain to the beneficiary, C is the cost to the actor and r is the number of its own offspring equivalents the actor expects in one of the offspring of the beneficiary. r is either called the coefficient of relatedness or coefficient of relationship, depending on how it is computed. The method of computing has changed over time, as has the terminology. It is not clear whether or not changes in the terminology followed changes in computation.

Robert Trivers (1974) defined "parent-offspring conflict" as any case where

$1<K<2$

i.e., K is between 1 and 2. The benefit is greater than the cost but is less than twice the cost. In this case, the parent would wish the offspring to behave as if r is 1 between siblings, although it is actually presumed to be 1/2 or closely approximated by 1/2. In other words, a parent would wish its offspring to give up ten offspring in order to raise 11 nieces and nephews. The offspring, when not manipulated by the parent, would require at least 21 nieces and nephews to justify the sacrifice of 10 of its own offspring.

The parent is trying to maximize its number of grandchildren, while the offspring is trying to maximize the number of its own offspring equivalents (via offspring and nieces and nephews) it produces. If the parent cannot manipulate the offspring and therefore loses in the conflict, the grandparents with the fewest grandchildren seem to be selected for. In other words, if the parent has no influence on the offspring's behaviour, grandparents with fewer grandchildren increase in frequency in the population.

By extension, parents with the fewest offspring will also increase in frequency. This seems to go against Ronald Fisher's "Fundamental Theorem of Natural Selection" which states that the change in fitness over the course of a generation equals the variance in fitness at the beginning of the generation. Variance is defined as the square of a quantity—standard deviation —and as a square must always be positive (or zero). That would imply that e fitness could never decrease as time passes. This goes along with the intuitive idea that lower fitness cannot be selected for. During parent-offspring conflict, the number of stranger equivalents reared per offspring equivalents reared is going down. Consideration of this phenomenon caused Orlove (1979) and Grafen (2006) to say that nothing is being maximized.

According to Trivers, if Sigmund Freud had tried to explain intra-family conflict after Hamilton instead of before him, he would have attributed the motivation for the conflict and for the castration complex to resource allocation issues rather than to sexual jealousy.

Incidentally, when k=1 or k=2, the average number of offspring per parent stays constant as time goes by. When k<1 or k>2 then the average number of offspring per parent increases as time goes by.

The term "gene" can refer to a locus (location) on an organism's DNA—a section that codes for a particular trait. Alternative versions of the code at that location are called "alleles." If there are two alleles at a locus, one of which codes for altruism and the other for selfishness, an individual who has one of each is said to be a heterozygote at that locus. If the heterozygote uses half of its resources raising its own offspring and the other half helping its siblings raise theirs, that condition is called codominance. If there is codominance the "2" in the above argument is exactly 2. If by contrast, the altruism allele is more dominant, then the 2 in the above would be replaced by a number smaller than 2. If the selfishness allele is the more dominant, something greater than 2 would replace the 2.

== Opposing view ==
A 2010 paper by Martin Nowak, Corina Tarnita, and E. O. Wilson suggested that standard natural selection theory is superior to inclusive fitness theory, stating that the interactions between cost and benefit cannot be explained only in terms of relatedness. This, Nowak said, makes Hamilton's rule at worst superfluous and at best ad hoc. Gardner in turn was critical of the paper, describing it as "a really terrible article", and along with 136 co-authors wrote a reply, submitted to Nature. The disagreement stems from a long history of confusion over what Hamilton's rule represents. Hamilton's rule gives the direction of mean phenotypic change (directional selection) so long as fitness is linear in phenotype, and the utility of Hamilton's rule is simply a reflection of when it is suitable to consider fitness as being linear in phenotype. The primary (and strictest) case is when evolution proceeds in very small mutational steps. Under such circumstances Hamilton's rule then emerges as the result of taking a first order Taylor series approximation of fitness with regards to phenotype. This assumption of small mutational steps (otherwise known as δ-weak selection) is often made on the basis of Fisher's geometric model and underpins much of modern evolutionary theory.

In work prior to Nowak et al. (2010), various authors derived different versions of a formula for $r$, all designed to preserve Hamilton's rule. Orlove noted that if a formula for $r$ is defined so as to ensure that Hamilton's rule is preserved, then the approach is by definition ad hoc. However, he published an unrelated derivation of the same formula for $r$ – a derivation designed to preserve two statements about the rate of selection – which on its own was similarly ad hoc. Orlove argued that the existence of two unrelated derivations of the formula for $r$ reduces or eliminates the ad hoc nature of the formula, and of inclusive fitness theory as well. The derivations were demonstrated to be unrelated by corresponding parts of the two identical formulae for $r$ being derived from the genotypes of different individuals. The parts that were derived from the genotypes of different individuals were terms to the right of the minus sign in the covariances in the two versions of the formula for $r$. By contrast, the terms left of the minus sign in both derivations come from the same source. In populations containing only two trait values, it has since been shown that $r$ is in fact Sewall Wright's coefficient of relationship.

Engles (1982) suggested that the c/b ratio be considered as a continuum of this behavioural trait rather than discontinuous in nature. From this approach fitness transactions can be better observed because there is more to what is happening to affect an individual's fitness than just losing and gaining.

== See also ==
- Criticism of evolutionary psychology
- Evolutionary psychology
- Gene-centered view of evolution
- Hamiltonian spite
- Kin selection
- Reproductive success
- r/K selection theory
