= Children's Guild =

Nonprofit organization in Maryland, US

Coordinates: 39°22′11″N 76°34′10″W

The Children's Guild is a non-profit organization that operates evidence-based behavioral health and child welfare programs, public charter and special education schools, and a national training and consulting program in the United States.

Founded in 1953, The Guild is an affiliate of The Children's Guild Alliance. The Guild's president and CEO is Jenny Livelli.

The Children's Guild Alliance is one of the largest providers of special education, group living, treatment foster care and family mental health services in Maryland.

The Guild develops playgrounds for children with disabilities. The Children's Guild-Transformation Academy in Baltimore, Maryland has a specially designed playground for children with autism spectrum disorder.
