= Prince of Wales flying squirrel =

Conservation status
- Apparently Secure (NatureServe)

Scientific classification
- Kingdom: Animalia
- Phylum: Chordata
- Class: Mammalia
- Order: Rodentia
- Family: Sciuridae
- Genus: Glaucomys
- Species: G. sabrinus
- Subspecies: G. s. griseifrons

Trinomial name
- Glaucomys sabrinus griseifrons A. H. Howell, 1934

Subspecies of rodent

The Prince of Wales flying squirrel (Glaucomys sabrinus griseifrons) is a subspecies of the northern flying squirrel endemic to Prince of Wales Island and a few neighboring islands in the Alexander Archipelago of Alaska.

== Taxonomy ==
This subspecies is genetically distinct from the mainland northern flying squirrel, according to evidence found in mitochondrial DNA and microsatelite data.

== Description ==
It has a unique coloration compared to other subspecies of the northern flying squirrel. It is whiter on the ventral side, darker on the dorsal side, and the head/neck area tend to be more gray than other subspecies. Adults are usually around 25-37 centimeters in length and 110-230 grams in weight.

== Habitat and range ==
The distribution history of G. s. griseifrons is unknown, but the subspecies probably colonized Prince of Wales after the last glacial maximum during the Holocene epoch. Sitka spruce (Picea sitchensis) and western hemlock (Tsuga heterophylla) are the primary habitat for G. s. griseifrons, due to their association with old growth forests of the area.

== Ecology ==
This subspecies is often considered a keystone species in the Southeastern Alaska area because it consumes and disperses conifer seeds and fungal spores into areas with little vegetation and sites of disturbance. The released fungi spores aid in the absorption of nutrients by plants and speed up regrowth in these areas. The American red squirrel tends to be the biggest competitor for resources for mainland populations of the northern flying squirrel. However, the American red squirrel is not found on the Prince of Wales islands, allowing the Prince of Wales flying squirrel does not have any major competitors.

=== Predation and disease ===
This subspecies has not been found to have high predation rates. Predators of these flying squirrels include raccoons, Pacific martens, and probably barred owls. The raccoon population on the island is small, and therefore most likely does not have a large impact on the flying squirrel population. Studies have shown that flying squirrels only make up about 5-7% of a marten's diet. A recent Prince of Wales inhabitant, the barred owl, likely predates on the flying squirrels, but there are no studies suggesting this. Humans have not been known to hunt this subspecies. Disease has not been shown to be a limiting factor in population growth. Currently any disease that may be affecting these squirrels is unknown.

=== Diet ===
Glaucomys sabrinus griseifrons have a generalized diet and can be considered mostly herbivorous, primarily eating fungi, lichens, green vegetation, berries, seeds and insects They have also been observed eating meat, young birds, and eggs. G. s. griseifrons is suggested to be more generalized in its diet than other subspecies of northern flying squirrels.

== Reproduction ==
The Prince of Wales flying squirrel is a r-selected species. They start breeding around one year old, or sometimes older, and usually have one litter each year of 1-6 young, averaging 2–4. Mating seasons tend to be around February through July, and the mothers will nurture them inside dens. The males do not play in a role in taking care of offspring. Infants take around five weeks after birth to become almost fully developed. After around ten weeks, they are able to glide and leap, and are ready to leave their mothers. Flying squirrel longevity can reach up to seven years old in the wild. From this, annual survival rates are suggested to be fairly high.

== Behavior ==
Despite its name, flying squirrels do not actually fly. They glide using a flap of skin called a patagium. Since they are arboreal mammals, they spend most of their life in old growth temperate rain forests in the high canopy. They are a non-migrating species and typically stay near areas in which they were born. They are active all year, even in the winter, because they do not hibernate. During cold weather in the winter, they huddle together to conserve heat. Groups as large as ten individuals have been documented. They are nocturnal with greatest activity right before dawn and right after dusk. They rest in dens during inactive times. They have a strong olfactory sense that helps them to detect food. The Prince of Wales flying squirrel tends to utilize dens in tree cavities or snags for storing food, hiding from predators, and reproduction. They do not spend much time on the ground in order to avoid predation. Northern flying squirrels are considered to be one of the most aerodynamic of mammals with the ability to travel between 3 and 45 meters in one glide. They travel between the trees to feed and in search of dens.

== Conservation ==
The population size is estimated to be greater than 10,000 individuals. Population densities are estimated to be around two to four flying squirrels per hectare (2.4 acres) on Prince of Wales. One study suggests that Prince of Wales flying squirrel densities are among the highest recorded in North America compared to other flying squirrels and the subspecies can occupy a variety of forests.

The Prince of Wales flying squirrel's primary habitat of old growth forests on Prince of Wales are mostly unprotected and timber harvests plan to remove 50-75% of old growth forests on the island. There is a push to protect the habitat of G. s. griseifrons with not much luck. The Forest Service has dedicated a few areas of old growth forest reservations. Evidence suggests that small reserve areas of old growth forest might support breeding populations.

In 2011, an organization called WildEarth Guardians petitioned to have G. s. griseifrons protected under the Endangered Species Act. The United States Fish and Wildlife Service found that the petition did not include enough information to warrant the subspecies to be protected under the act. The USFWS listed several reasons for not listing the species under the ESA. A study found that the Prince of Wales flying squirrel averages around 3-7 different dens per month which suggests that despite the forests of POW not being protected, the flying squirrels are not struggling to find suitable habitats. The USFWS also stated that another study shows population densities at 1-4 squirrels per hectare, suggesting that the subspecies is at a stable population level. Another study stated that gene flow and dispersal around the islands are occurring suggesting that these are not limiting factors for population growth. Other reports state that the population could decline between 10 and 30% in the short-term future due to increased timber and harvesting of forests on Prince of Wales islands.

Future research must be done on several different topics. Research needs include clarifying taxonomic status, further sampling of range, determining population trends and abundance patterns, dependence on old-growth forests, and impacts of logging and harvesting to the viability of the population.
