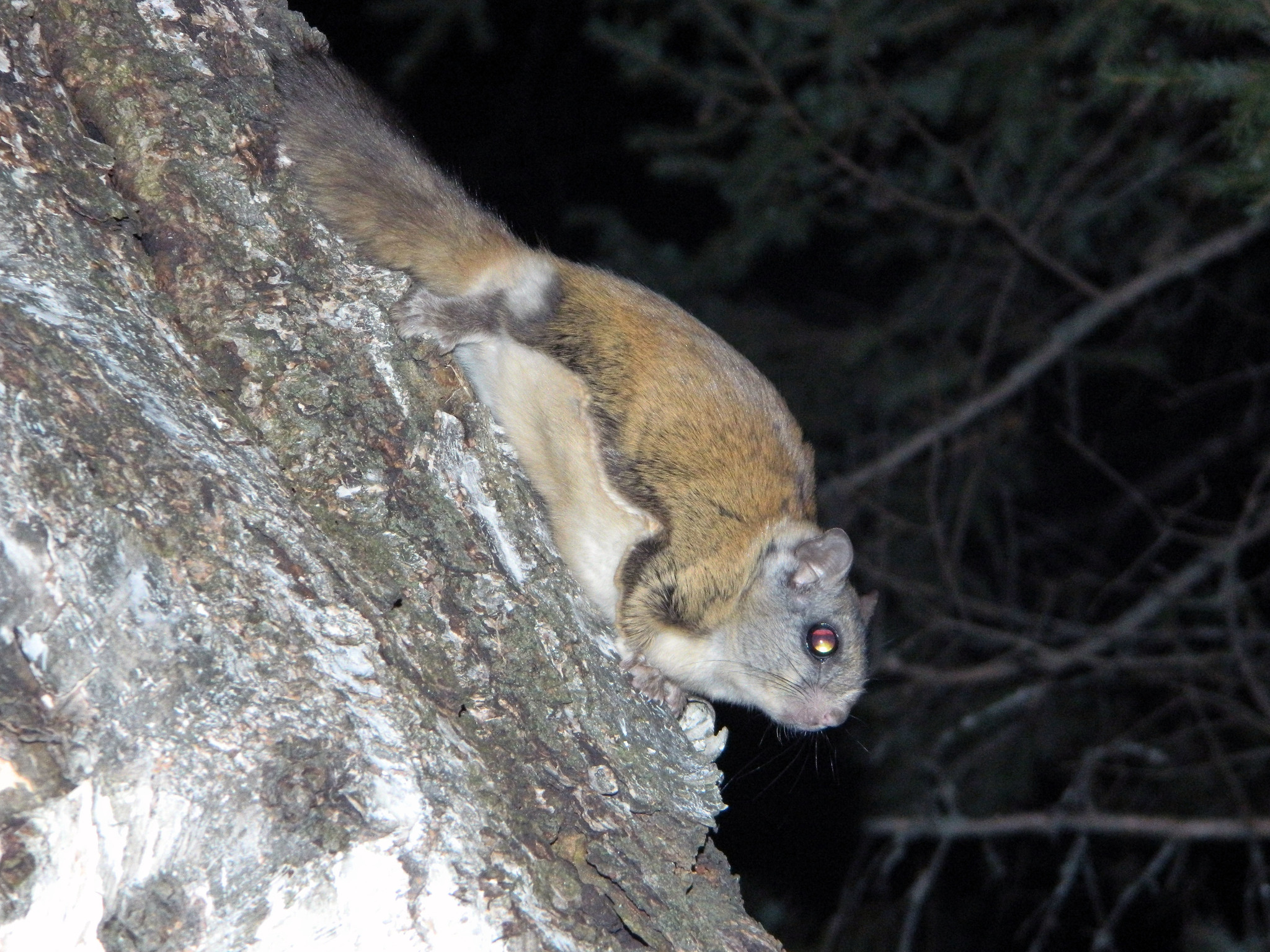

Conservation status
- Least Concern (IUCN 3.1)

Scientific classification
- Kingdom: Animalia
- Phylum: Chordata
- Class: Mammalia
- Order: Rodentia
- Family: Sciuridae
- Genus: Glaucomys
- Species: G. sabrinus

Binomial name
- Glaucomys sabrinus (Shaw, 1801)

Subspecies
- see text
- Northern flying squirrel range^{(excludes Glaucomys oregonensis)}

= Northern flying squirrel =

Species of rodent

The northern flying squirrel (Glaucomys sabrinus) is one of three species of the genus Glaucomys, the only flying squirrels found in North America. They are found in coniferous and mixed coniferous forests across much of Canada, from Alaska to Nova Scotia, south to the mountains of North Carolina and west to Utah in the United States. They are light brown with pale underparts and grow to a length of 25 to 37 cm (10 to 15 in). They are proficient gliders but uncoordinated walkers on the ground. The species feeds on a variety of plant material as well as tree sap, fungi, insects, carrion, bird eggs and nestlings. They mostly breed once a year in a cavity lined with lichen or other soft material. Except when they have young, they change nests frequently, and in winter a number of individuals may huddle together in a shared nest. Unlike most members of their family, flying squirrels are strictly nocturnal.

== Subspecies ==
Currently, 25 subspecies are recognized:

- G. s. sabrinus
- G. s. alpinus
- G. s. bangsi
- G. s. californcus
- G. s. canescens
- G. s. coloratus
- G. s. columbiensis
- G. s. flaviventris
- G. s. fuliginosus
- G. s. fuscus
- G. s. goodwini
- G. s. gouldi
- G. s. griseifrons
- G. s. klamathensis
- G. s. lascivus
- G. s. latipes
- G. s. lucifugus
- G. s. macrotis
- G. s. makkovikensis
- G. s. murinauralis
- G. s. reductus
- G. s. stephensi
- G. s. yukonensis
- G. s. zaphaeus

== Habitat and range ==
The northern flying squirrel is found in coniferous and mixed coniferous forests across the top of North America, from Alaska to Nova Scotia, south to the mountains of North Carolina and Tennessee and west to Utah. The Humboldt's flying squirrel was formerly considered conspecific, but was found to be a cryptic species, and now considered distinct. It is generally smaller and darker than northern flying squirrel and occurs in British Columbia, northern California, Washington and Oregon.

Two subspecies are found in the southern Appalachians, the Carolina northern flying squirrel, G. s. coloratus, and the West Virginia northern flying squirrel G. s. fuscus, both of which are endangered, although the West Virginia subspecies has recovered enough that it was delisted in August 2008.

The U.S. Fish and Wildlife Service temporarily put the West Virginia northern flying squirrel back under protection on June 6, 2011, in response to a court order. On appeal, the delisting was reinstated in March 2013.

G. s. californicus, the San Bernardino flying squirrel, is found in the San Bernardino National Forest in California. In 2010, the Center for Biological Diversity petitioned the U.S. Fish and Wildlife Service to give the San Bernardino flying squirrel protections as an endangered species, but ultimately their request was denied. The U.S. Fish and Wildlife Service said, "in a thorough status review of the species using the best available science, the Service has found that the squirrel is abundant where it is found and that the threats to habitat loss from urban development, habitat fragmentation, wildfire, urban air pollution and climate change do not pose significant threats to its long-term survival." The Center for Biological Diversity argues that temperature changes are reducing the San Bernardino flying squirrel's forest habitat and negatively affecting the availability of the truffles it feeds on, with urban development impacting the area as well.

== Description ==
These nocturnal, arboreal rodents have thick light brown or cinnamon fur on their upper body and greyish fur on the flanks and whitish fur underneath. They have large eyes and a flat tail. They can also be identified by their long whiskers, common to nocturnal mammals. The adult northern flying squirrel measures from 25 to 37 cm long, and their weight can range from 110 to 230 grams.

== Gliding ==
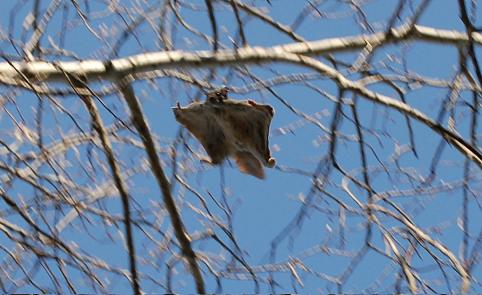
Gliding

Flying squirrels do not actually fly, they glide using a patagium created by a fold of skin. From atop trees, flying squirrels can initiate glides from a running start or from a stationary position by bringing their limbs under the body, retracting their heads, and then propelling themselves off the tree. It is believed that they use triangulation to estimate the distance of the landing as they often lean out and pivot from side to side before jumping. Once in the air, they form an "X" with their limbs, causing their membrane to stretch into a square-like shape and glide down at angles of 30 to 40 degrees. They maneuver with great efficiency in the air, making 90 degree turns around obstacles if needed. Just before reaching a tree, they raise their flattened tails, which abruptly changes their trajectory upwards, and point all of their limbs forward to create a parachute effect with the membrane to reduce the shock of landing. The limbs absorb the remainder of the impact, and the squirrels immediately run to the other side of the trunk or to the top of the tree to avoid any potential predators. Although graceful in flight, they are very clumsy walkers and if they happen to be on the ground in the presence of danger, they will prefer to hide rather than attempt to escape.

== Diet ==
A major food source for the squirrels are fungi of various species, although they also eat lichens, all mast-crop nuts, tree sap, insects, carrion, bird eggs and nestlings, buds and flowers. The squirrels are able to locate truffles by olfaction, though they also seem to use cues such as the presence of coarse woody debris, indicating a decaying log, and spatial memory of locations where truffles were found in the past.

The northern flying squirrel is also known to cache food for when food supplies are lower. These caches can be in cavities in trees, as well as in the squirrels' nest. Lichens and seeds are commonly cached.

== Behaviour ==
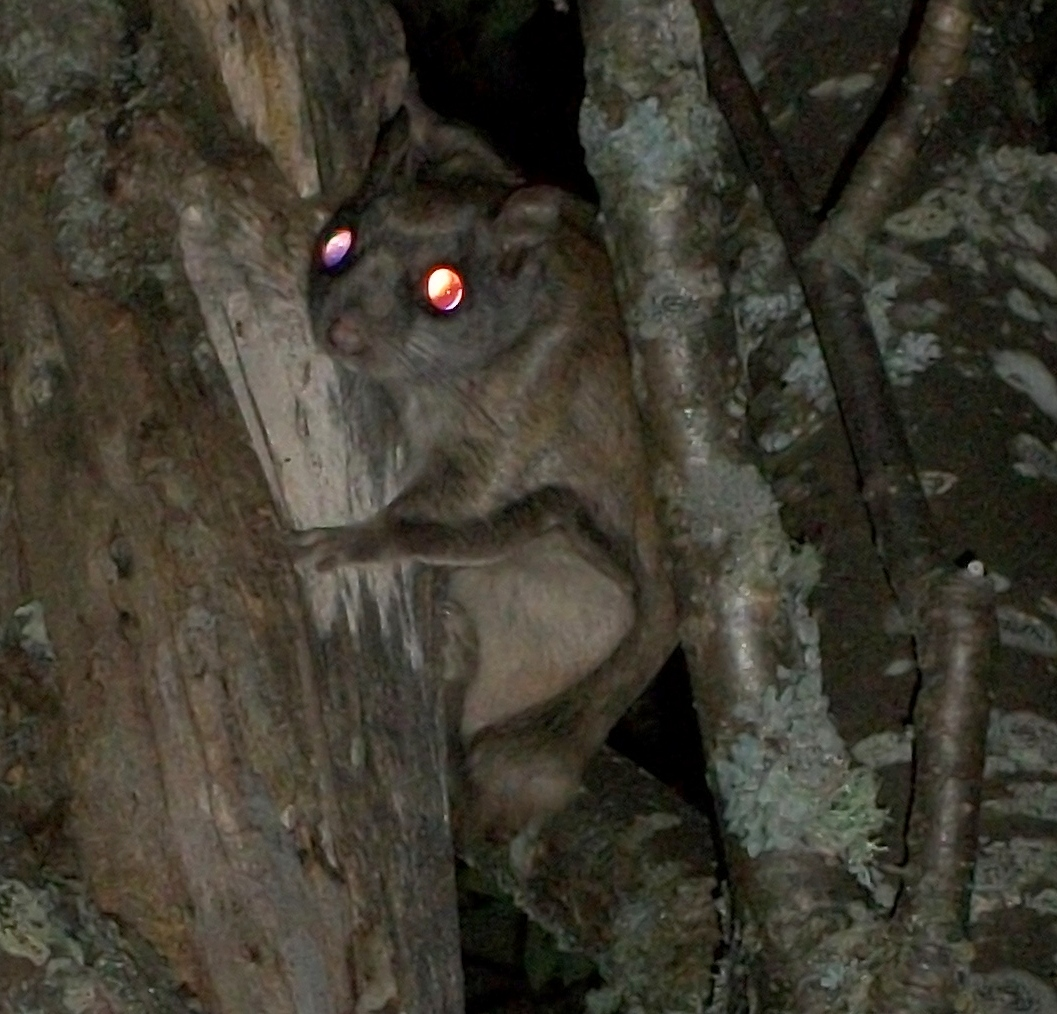
Northern flying squirrel

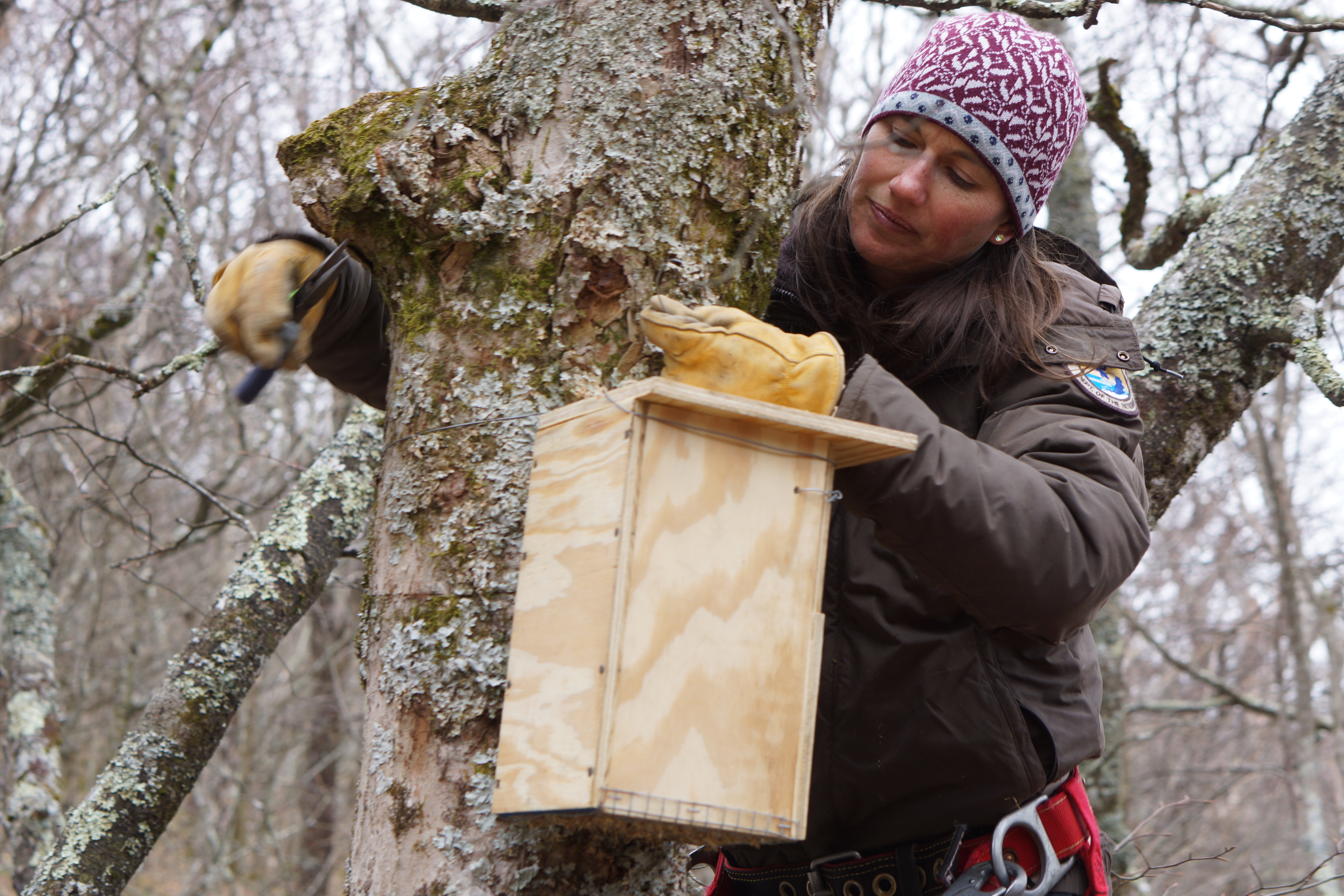
Installation of a new squirrel box off the Blue Ridge Parkway

Northern flying squirrels generally nest in holes in trees, preferring large-diameter trunks and dead trees, and will also build outside leaf nests called dreys and will also nest underground. Tree cavities created by woodpeckers as suitable nest sites tend to be more abundant in old-growth forests, and so do the squirrels, though harvested forests can be managed in ways that are likely to increase squirrel numbers. Nests may also be established in buildings, including parts of occupied homes. Except when rearing young, the squirrels shift from nest to nest frequently. They often share nests during winter months, forming aggregations. Usually, aggregate nests contain 4 to 10 individuals. The sharing of nests in winter by northern flying squirrels is important in maintaining body temperature (biothermal regulation), as northern flying squirrels do not hibernate, nor do they enter torpor states.

Northern flying squirrels gliding distances tend to be between 5 and 25 metres, though glides of up to 45 m and longer have been observed. Average glides are about 5 m less for females than for males. Glide angle has been measured at 26.8 degrees and glide ratio at 1.98.

Since first documented by Shaw in 1801, the general understanding was that northern flying squirrels bred but once per year. Recently, in southern Ontario, Canada, polyestrous behaviour (two litters per year) has been documented for the first time. This observation has since been confirmed by a second research team in New Brunswick, Canada.

In southern Ontario, Canada, genetic evidence has recently shown hybridization with the rapid northward expansion and increased sympatry of southern flying squirrels.

== Predation ==
Northern flying squirrels, along with pine squirrels, are a primary prey species for the spotted owl (Strix occidentalis) and eastern screech owl (Megascops asio). Other predators include various other large birds, especially the great horned owl and hawks, as well as mammals including American martens, Canadian lynxes, and red foxes. Given this information, taking a closer look at how animals are affected in their environment beyond their predators is relevant. For example, the northern spotted owl is an endangered species, as well as one of the primary predators of the northern flying squirrel. The northern flying squirrel and spotted owl species are closely connected, as they thrive in very similar environments. The owl’s endangerment ties closely to the destruction of their habitat, which also impacts the northern flying squirrel. Conserving their shared habitat could help both species thrive.

However, if the owl’s threat were to decrease, meaning that their population increases, there would be a higher risk for the northern flying squirrel, being that they are the owl’s primary food source. This relationship demonstrates a connection between the predator and prey in this circumstance, given that the owl’s endangerment is heavily affected by habitat destruction. Many people would say that there is no need to conserve the forests, as the lumber industry is driving economic success in many parts of the world. This creates a much bigger threat for forest animals beyond their predators.

== Human impacts ==
Human activities bring large threats to forest animals, including the northern flying squirrel. As mentioned in the previous section, the lumber industry is bringing economic success to businesses all over the world, which often starts in forests. Whether it's clear-cutting or developing the land that forests are on, it is all harmful to the animals that reside there. With the lumber industry relying heavily on the dense forests where animals like the northern flying squirrel live, it brings major threats.

Some forests have been completely destroyed, forcing the animals out and causing them to have to find new homes. Partial destruction also can potentially cause problems, as it forces all of the animals who live there to coexist in a smaller area than before. Fragmentation can be the result of partial forest destruction. As developers often put roads or neighborhoods on the land that used to be a forest, the forest that is left behind is often fragmented, or broken up into various parts. This can cause a threat to the remaining animals, as they may have to cross roads or highways to get to the other parts of the forests, which is especially dangerous.

When cutting down forests, this not only destroys the habitat of the animals, but it can bring bigger problems that are not as obvious, such as pollution. When machinery is used to cut down trees and clear forests, it can release harmful chemicals, polluting the soil, air and water nearby.

Ultimately, humans are responsible for many of the threats to species like the northern flying squirrel that occur within a forest.
