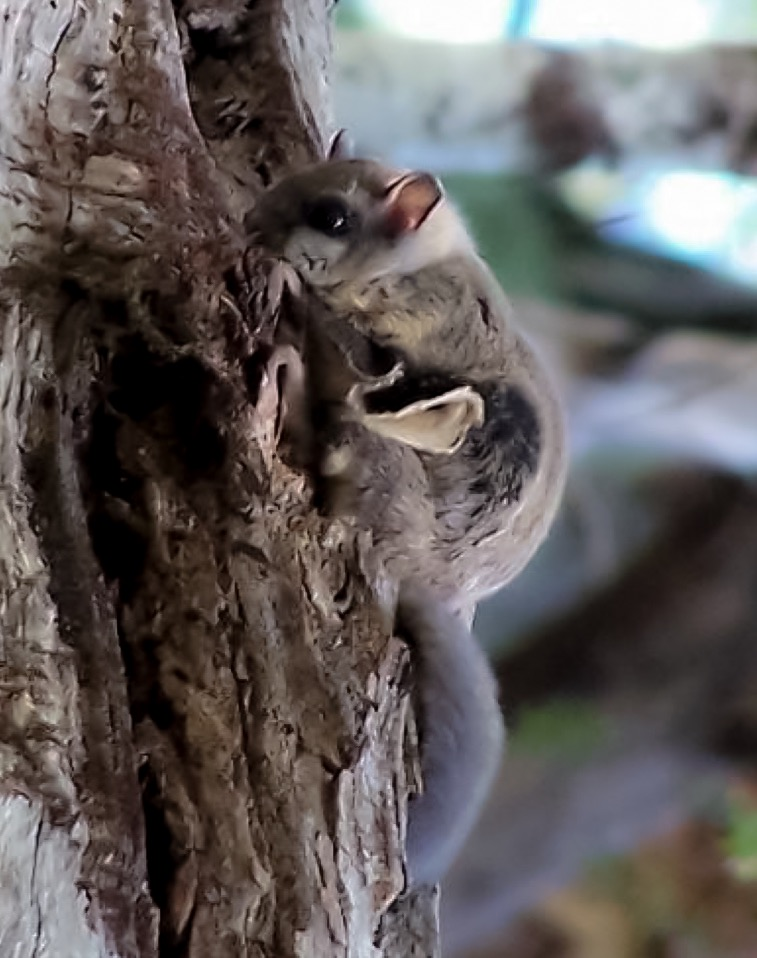

Conservation status
- Secure (NatureServe)

Scientific classification
- Kingdom: Animalia
- Phylum: Chordata
- Class: Mammalia
- Order: Rodentia
- Family: Sciuridae
- Genus: Glaucomys
- Species: G. oregonensis

Binomial name
- Glaucomys oregonensis (Bachman, 1839)

= Humboldt's flying squirrel =

Species of rodent

Humboldt's flying squirrel (Glaucomys oregonensis) is one of three species of the genus Glaucomys, the only flying squirrels found in North America. The squirrel was named after the naturalist Alexander von Humboldt.

== Taxonomy ==
Using genetic analyses, Arbogast et al. (2017) showed that Humboldt's flying squirrel, previously thought to be conspecific with the northern flying squirrel, was actually a distinct species. Within G. oregonesis, there are currently a total of eight named subspecies, with six of those subspecies distributed across California, and the other two subspecies distributed across Oregon and Washington. The San Bernardino flying squirrel subspecies (G. o. californicus) in particular, is considered a Critically Imperiled Subspecies by NatureServe.

== Description ==
They do not actually fly, but instead use a furred membrane that lies between their limbs that creates the ability to glide glide from tree to tree. They can glide up to 45 meters. They are good gliders but clumsy walkers on the ground. Humboldt's flying squirrels are, in general, a darker color than the northern flying squirrel counterparts. The squirrels have a tan upper body, white underside, and a flat tail. In addition, they are smaller in stature, with a mean weight of 129g for males and 138g for females. A studied type specimen measured 169 mm in body length, 143 mm in tail length, and 35 mm in hind foot.

=== Fluorescence ===
Under ultraviolet light, females and males of all 3 species of Glaucomys fluoresce in varying intensities of pink on both dorsal and ventral surfaces. The fluorescence is hypothesized to help the flying squirrels find each other in low light and mimic the plumage of owls to evade predation. This hypothesis has been challenged by Toussaint et al. (2022) who instead suggest that the pink luminescence is a byproduct of the body's waste management. Moreover, these authors argue that it is far from evident that UV illuminating sources that occur naturally are sufficient to elicit luminescence distinguishable from ambient visible light. An ecological role for the pink luminescence is therefore not likely.

== Diet and behaviour ==
They feed on a variety of plant material as well as tree sap, fungi, insects, carrion, bird eggs and nestlings. They mostly breed once a year in a cavity lined with lichen or other soft material. Unlike most members of their family, flying squirrels are strictly nocturnal. They nest in the tops of the trees away from the ground and predators. As part of their nocturnal behavior, Humboldt’s flying squirrels have been known to vocalize. Like other flying squirrel species, Humboldt’s flying squirrel produces calls extending into the ultrasonic range and are thought to be of communicative function. At least 7 distinct high-frequency call types have been described.

== Reproduction ==
The full range of reproduction occurs from April to August. The mother provides the majority of the care for their young. About 60 days after birth, although sometimes longer, the squirrels wean off of their mothers. That being said, there have been reports of Humboldt's flying squirrels nesting communally, with variation in the summer and winter months. In the summer months, once they have given birth, mother squirrels do not nest with other adults and have much less overlap in their home ranges. In a study following populations located in Oregon and Washington, squirrel pups were found outside the nest from approximately August to October. Humboldt’s flying squirrels are believed to be a K-selected species with population numbers depending on keeping existing adult squirrels alive rather than relying on rapid reproduction.

== Predators ==
Due to their abundance in the forest ecosystems, they have turned into an important food source for a variety of different predators. One of the squirrels’ main predators is the California Spotted Owl. The owls live and hunt in mature conifer forests, making them a key predator of the squirrels. Also, they are some top prey items for Humboldt Martens in the Coast Ranges.

== Distribution and habitat ==
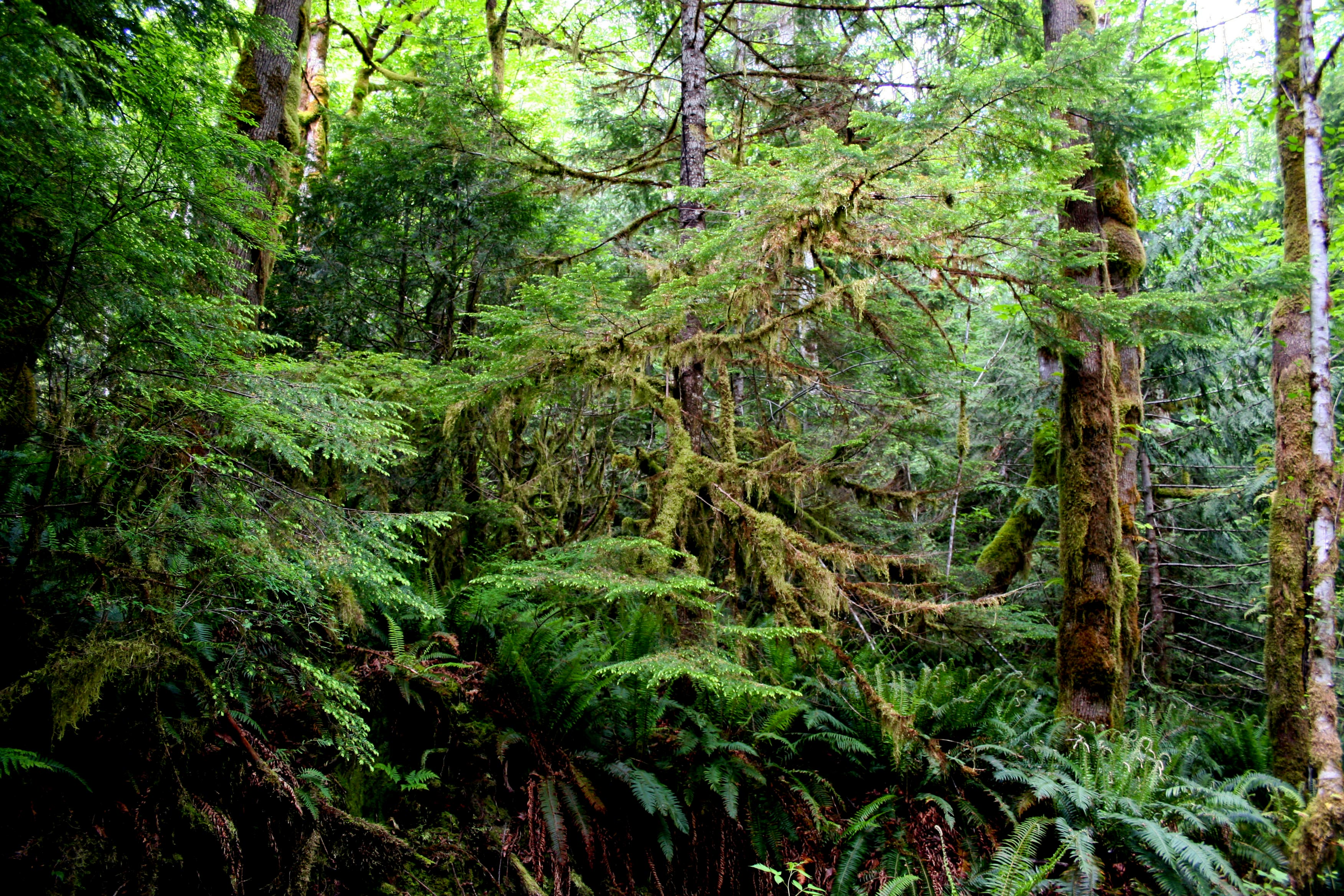
Habitat of Humboldt's flying squirrel

Humboldt's flying squirrels are found in coniferous and mixed coniferous forests from southern British Columbia to southern California. They live in thick coastal forests where there is plenty of room for them to glide from tree to tree. Populations of Humboldt's flying squirrels are more concentrated in old forests where the relatively stable environment allows for fewer offspring in each litter. The northernmost subspecies of Humboldt’s flying squirrels has been well studied in the Sierra Nevada and Cascade Mountains, where it is noted that they prefer large, contiguous stands of old-growth coniferous forests. They use these large diameter trees for their denning habitat as well as for the cover and food resources they provide. A study in Oregon also found that Humboldt's flying squirrel are associated with berry-producing plants, which may indicate that understory vegetation plays a factor in the species habitat. The same study notes that increased populations of Humboldt’s flying squirrels were recorded after milder winters and at lower elevations, suggesting that severe cold may affect their populations. As for the southernmost subspecies, there is less documentation on their habitat preferences.

== Human impact ==
The isolated San Bernardino subspecies restricted to the San Bernardino and San Jacinto Mountains has been impacted in particular by anthropogenic threats and was designated as a subspecies of special concern by the California Department of Fish and Wildlife. Due to their isolation, being nearly 220km away from the nearest population of flying squirrels, the San Bernardino subspecies suffers from reduced genetic diversity, which heightens the risk of extinction.
