= Spite (game theory) =

In fair division problems, spite is a phenomenon that occurs when a player's value of an allocation decreases when one or more other players' valuation increases. Thus, other things being equal, a player exhibiting spite will prefer an allocation in which other players receive less than more (if more of the good is desirable).

In this language, spite is difficult to analyze because one has to assess two sets of preferences. For example, in the divide and choose method, a spiteful player would have to make a trade-off between depriving his opponent of cake, and getting more himself.

Within the field of sociobiology, spite is used to describe those social behaviors that have a negative impact on both the actor and recipient(s). Spite can be favored by kin selection when: (a) it leads to an indirect benefit to some third party that is sufficiently related to the actor (Wilsonian spite); or (b) when it is directed primarily at negatively related individuals (Hamiltonian spite). Negative relatedness occurs when two individuals are less related than average.

== In game theory ==
The iterated prisoner's dilemma provides an example where players may "punish" each other for failing to cooperate in previous rounds, even if doing so would cause negative consequences for both players. For example, the simple "tit for tat" strategy has been shown to be effective in round-robin tournaments of iterated prisoner's dilemma.

== In industrial relations ==
There is always difficulty in fairly dividing the proceeds of a business between the business owners and the employees.

When a trade union decides to call a strike, both employer and the union members lose money (and may damage the national economy). The unionists hope that the employer will give in to their demands before such losses have destroyed the business.

In the reverse direction, an employer may terminate the employment of certain productive workers who are agitating for higher wages or organising a trade union. Losing productive workers is a setback to both the business and the employees but this can serve as an example to others and thus maximise employer power.

== In behavioral ecology ==
Polyembryonic wasps, including C. floridanum, exhibit spite through instances of precocious larval development. Spite provides an explanation for how natural selection can favor harmful behaviors that are costly to both the actor and the recipient; spite is typically considered a form of altruism that benefits a secondary recipient. Two criteria demonstrate that spite is truly occurring: (i) the behavior is truly costly to the actor and does not provide a long-term direct benefit; and (ii) harming behaviors are directed toward relatively unrelated individuals.

== See also ==
- Appeal to spite
- Hamilton's rule
- Spite (sentiment)
