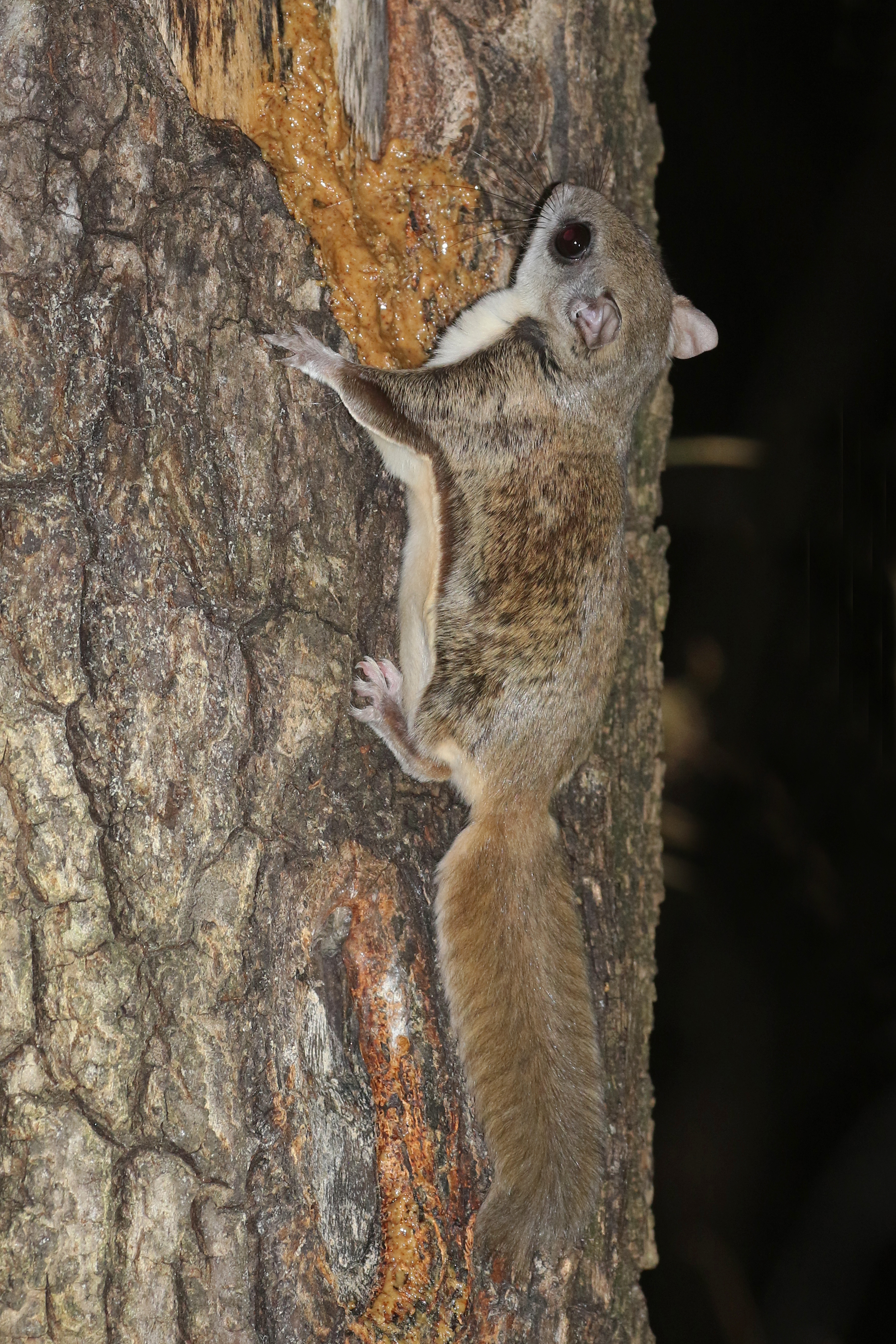
- In Virginia, USA

Conservation status
- Least Concern (IUCN 3.1)

Scientific classification
- Kingdom: Animalia
- Phylum: Chordata
- Class: Mammalia
- Order: Rodentia
- Family: Sciuridae
- Genus: Glaucomys
- Species: G. volans

Binomial name
- Glaucomys volans (Linnaeus, 1758)

Subspecies
- G. v. volans; G. v. chontali; G. v. goldmani; G. v. guerreroensis; G. v. herreranus; G. v. madrensis; G. v. oaxacensis; G. v. querceti; G. v. saturatus; G. v. texensis; G. v. underwoodi
- Southern flying squirrel range

Synonyms
- Mus volans Linnaeus, 1758; Sciurus volans (Linnaeus, 1758); Sciuropterus volans (Linnaeus, 1758); Pteromys volans (Linnaeus, 1758); Sciuropterus americanus Desmarest, 1827

= Southern flying squirrel =

Species of rodent

The southern flying squirrel (Glaucomys volans), sometimes called the assapan or polatouche, is a species of squirrel in the family Sciuridae. G. volans is one of three species of flying squirrels found in North America. It is found in deciduous and mixed woods in the eastern half of North America, from southeastern Canada to Florida. Disjunct populations of this species have been recorded in the highlands of Mexico, Guatemala, and Honduras. There are 11 subspecies that are recognized as being valid, including the nominotypical subspecies.

== Description and ecology ==
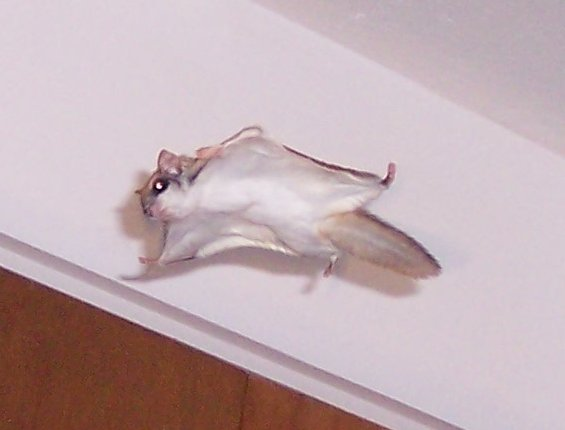
Flying squirrel in flight

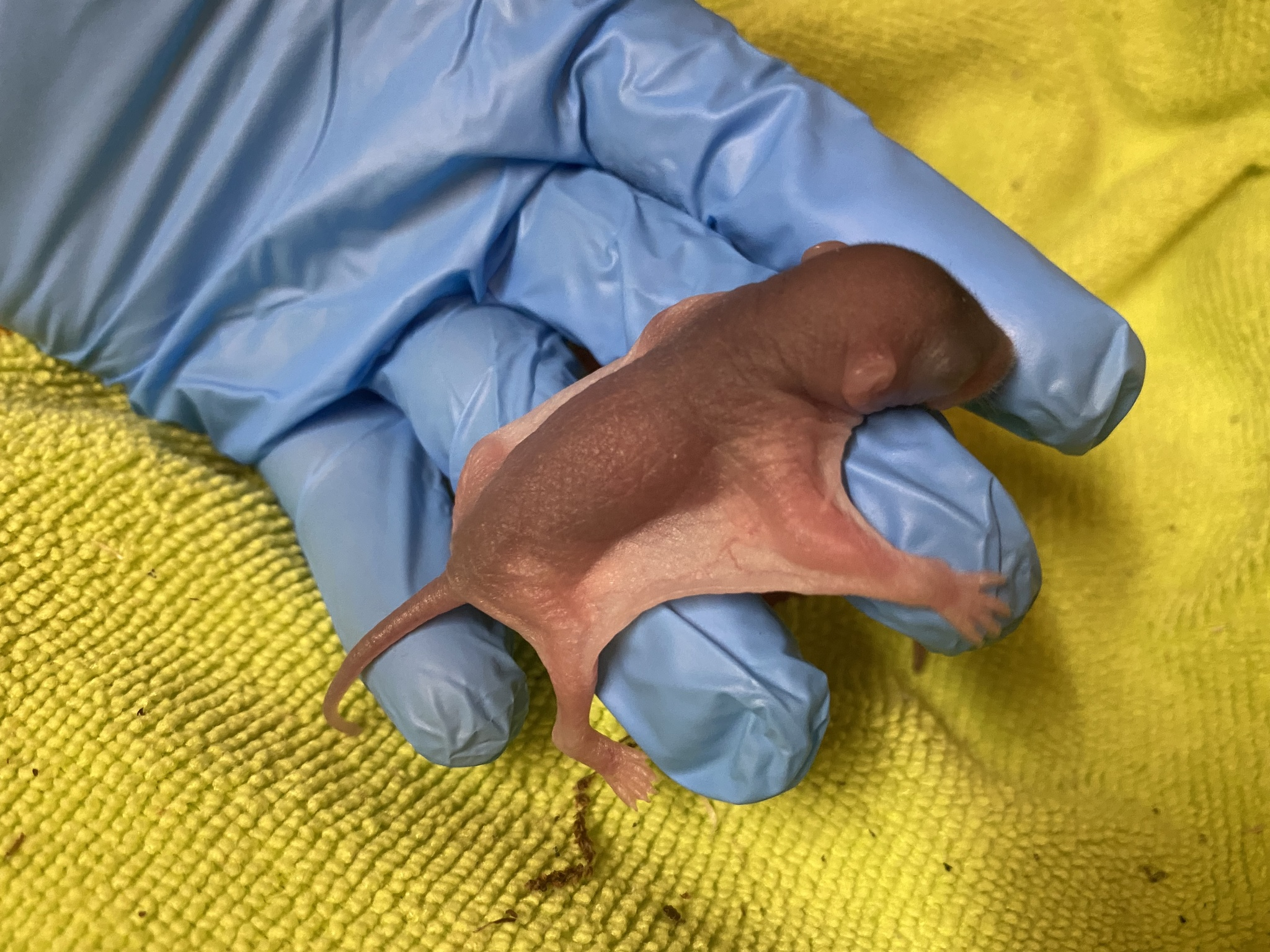
2-day old baby, in Tennessee, USA

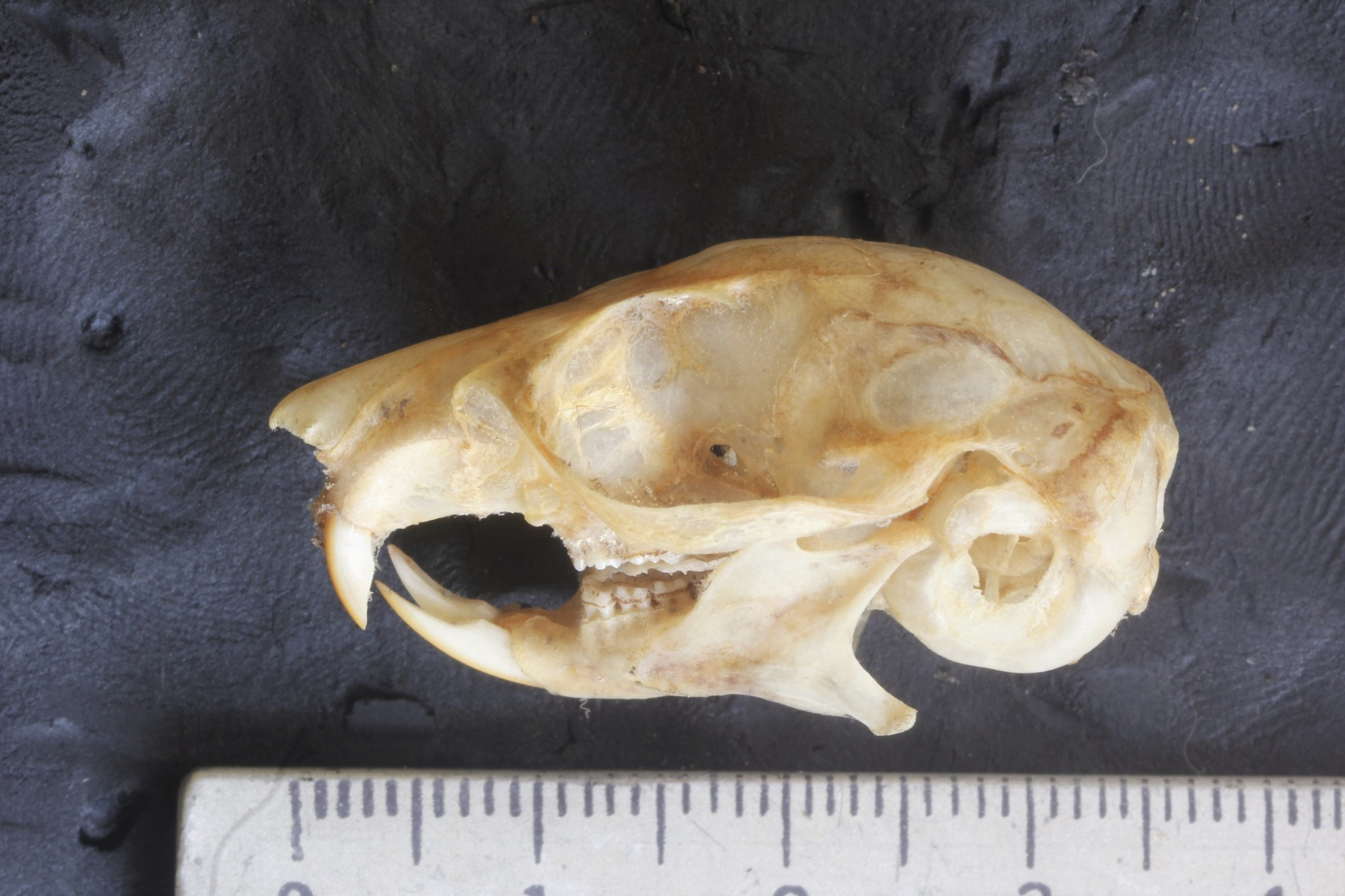
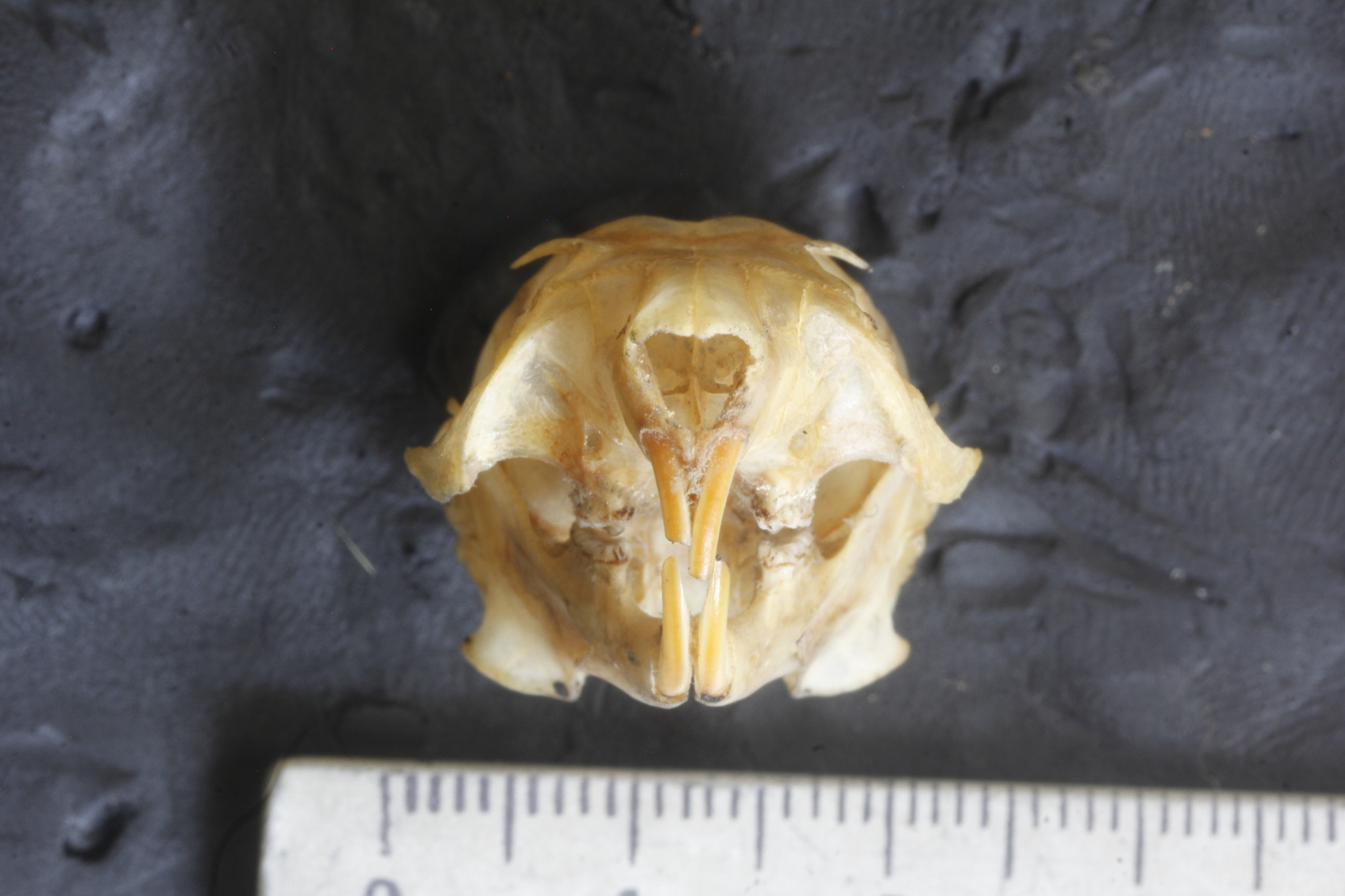
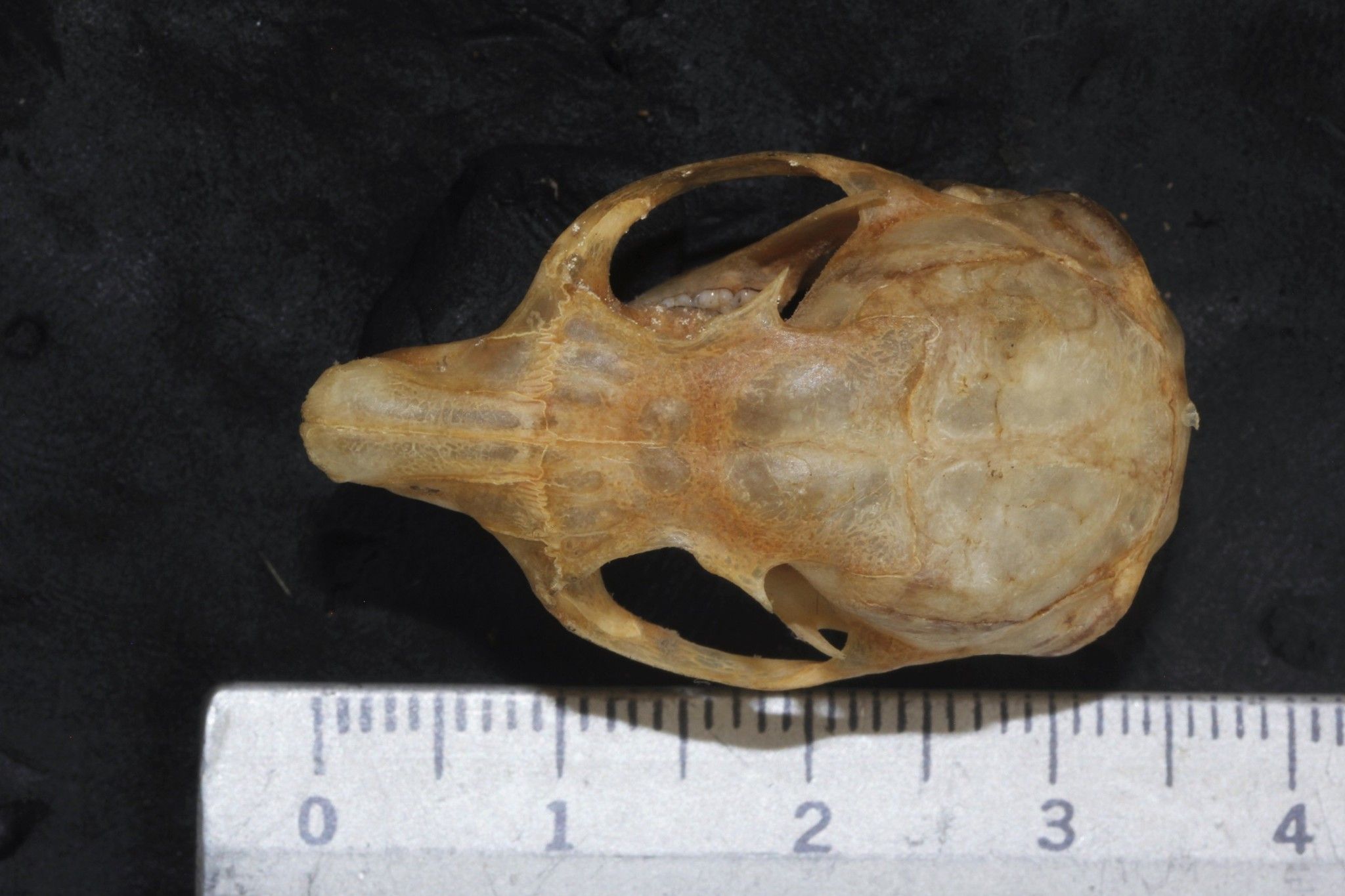
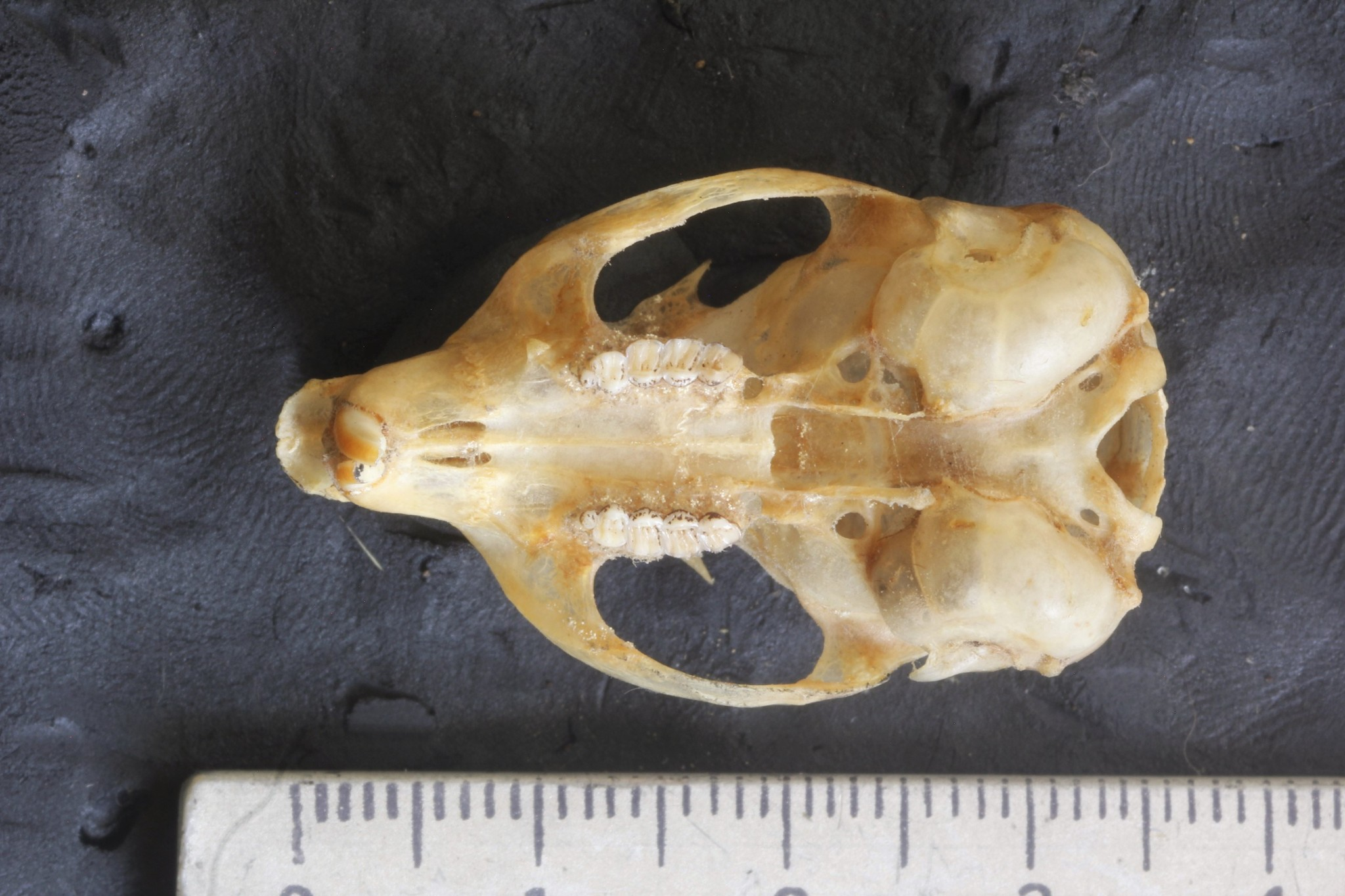
Skull

Southern flying squirrels have grey-brown fur on top with darker flanks and are a cream colored underneath. They have large dark eyes and flattened tails. They have a furry membrane called a patagium that extends from the front to the rear legs and is used to glide through the air. Total length (including tail) is 21–26 cm (8.3–10.2 in). The tail can be 8–12 cm (3.1–4.7 in).

They are nocturnal and feed on fruits and nuts from trees such as red and white oak, hickory, and beech. They store food, especially acorns, for winter consumption. They also dine on insects, buds, mushrooms, mycorrhizal fungi, carrion, bird eggs, nestlings, and flowers. Their predators include snakes, owls, hawks, and raccoons. Domestic cats can also be potential predators.

Both in the wild and in captivity, they can produce two litters of young each year (with 2–7 young per litter). The gestation period is approximately 40 days. Young are born without fur or any capabilities of their own. Their ears open at 2 to 6 days old, and fur grows in by 7 days. Their eyes do not open until they are 24–30 days old. Mothers wean their young 65 days after they are born. The young then become fully independent at around 120 days of age.

Southern flying squirrels show substantial homing abilities and can return to their nests if artificially removed to distances of up to a kilometer. Their home ranges may be up to 40,000 m^{2} (430,000 sq ft) for females and double that for males, tending to be larger at the northern extreme of their range.

Exposure to southern flying squirrels has been linked to cases of epidemic typhus in humans. Typhus spread by flying squirrels is known as "sylvatic typhus" and the Centers for Disease Control and Prevention has documented a total of 39 such cases in the U.S. from 1976 to 2001. The squirrel acts as host to the Rickettsia prowazekii bacteria and transmission to humans is hypothesized to occur via aerosolized feces of the fleas and lice associated with G. volans.

== Gliding ==
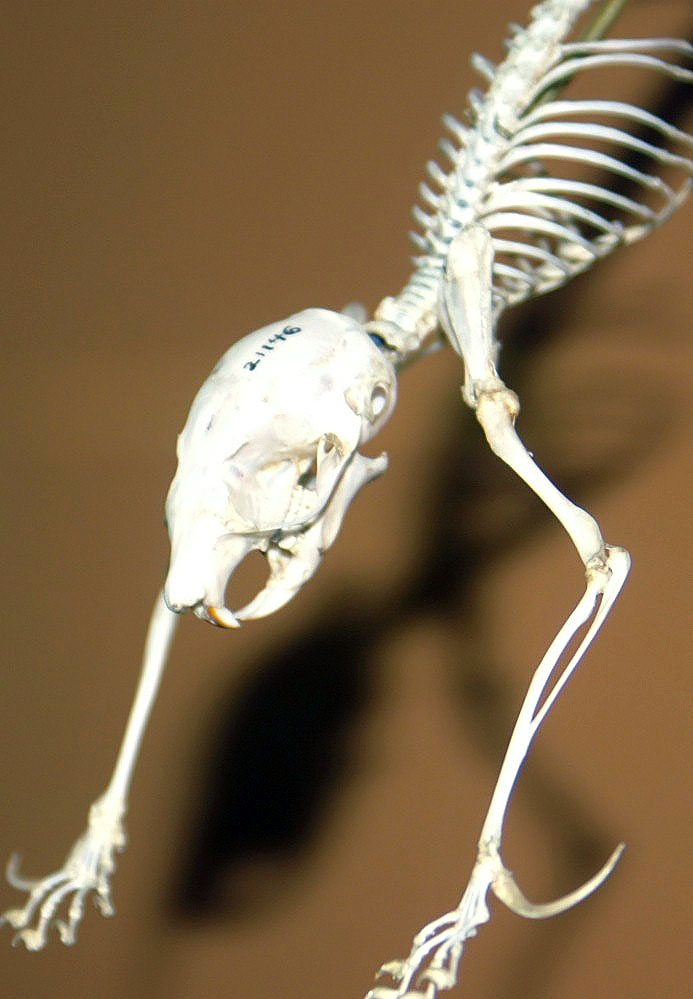
The styliform cartilage attached to the wrist supports the gliding membrane. Skeleton at the NMNH.

Flying squirrels do not actually fly, but rather glide using a membrane called a patagium. From atop trees, flying squirrels can initiate glides from a running start or from a stationary position by bringing their limbs under the body, retracting their heads, and then propelling themselves off the tree. It is believed that they use triangulation to estimate the distance of the landing area as they often lean out and pivot from side to side before jumping. Once in the air, they spread their long arms forward and out and their long legs backward and out, causing their membrane to stretch into a square-like shape and glide down at angles of 30 to 40 degrees. They maneuver with great efficiency in the air, making 90-degree turns around obstacles if needed. Just before reaching a tree, they raise their flattened tails to abruptly change their trajectory upward, and point all of their limbs forward; this creates a parachute effect with the membrane in order to reduce the shock of landing. The limbs absorb the remainder of the impact, and the squirrels immediately run to the other side of the trunk or to the top of the tree in order to avoid any potential predators. Although graceful in flight, they are very clumsy walkers, and if they happen to be on the ground in the presence of danger, they will prefer to hide rather than attempt to escape.

== Habitat ==
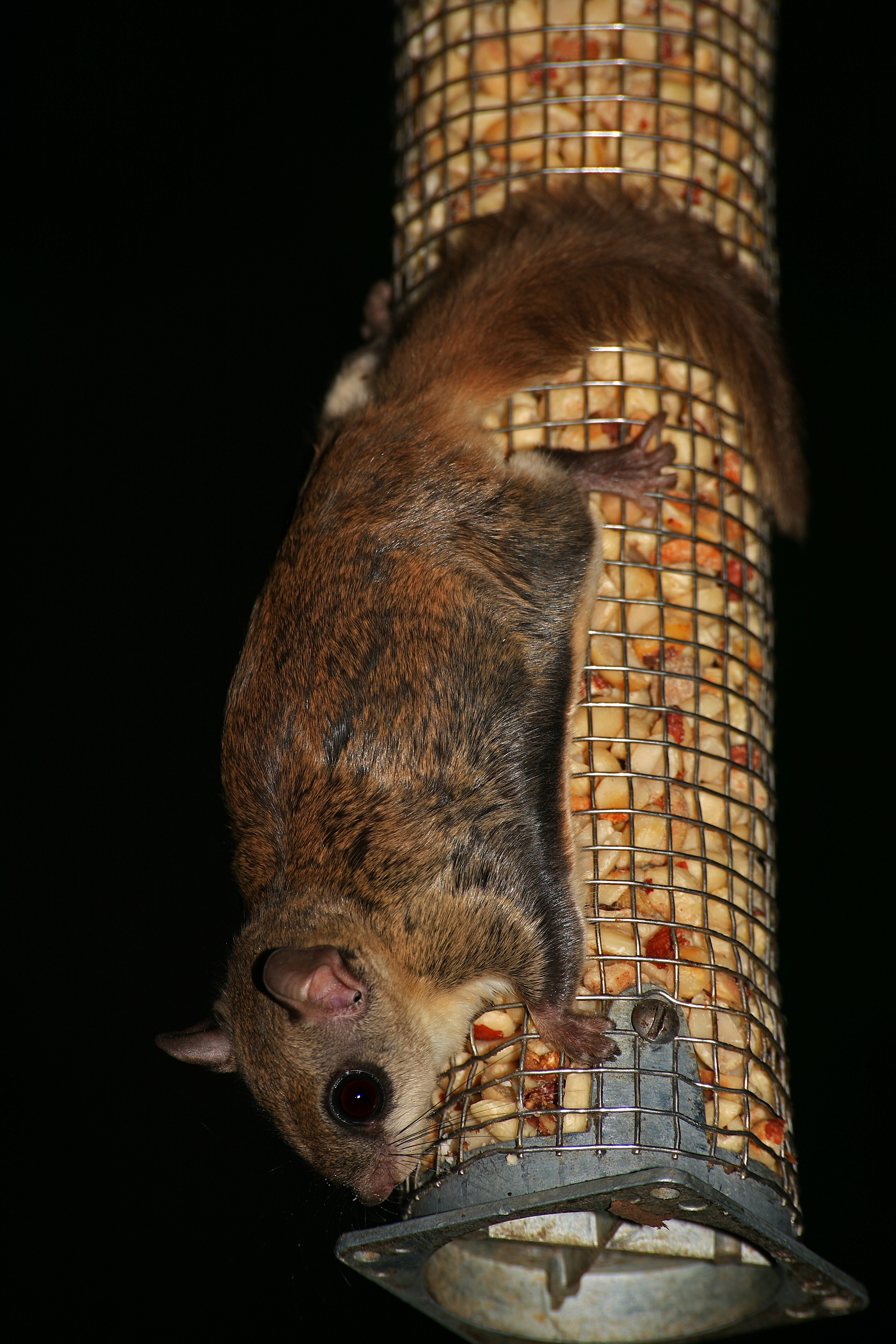
Southern flying squirrel at a bird peanut feeder, Cleveland, Ohio

The southern flying squirrel is found in eastern deciduous forests or mixed forests of North America. Large hickory and beech trees are more abundant in intensively used areas of their home ranges. Also, maple and poplar, as well as oak trees, make favorable habitats. Although southern flying squirrels may be present in heavily wooded suburban regions, they never occur in large numbers in these areas.

The size of the home range of southern flying squirrels varies greatly. Average home range estimates are 2.45 hectares (6.1 acres), 9 ha (22 acres), and 16 ha (40 acres) for adult males, 1.95 ha (4.8 acres), 3.9 ha (9.6 acres), and 7.2 ha (18 acres) for adult females, and 0.61 ha (1.5 acres) for juveniles. Significant overlap exists among the home ranges. Near the northern limit of the southern flying squirrels distribution, home range increases in size as mast-producing trees become more dispersed. This trend is also observed in fragmented forests where nesting and foraging areas become widely spaced.

Home range is larger in males than females possibly to increase the chance of encountering potential mates. Although males have a larger home range, female home ranges have been shown to increase by as much as 70 percent following the departure of the offspring.

Number of nesting sites does not influence the total number of flying squirrels but may influence which sex will be present. Male home ranges contain more food as they have been associated with a higher than expected number of large red oaks and white oaks, whereas female home ranges contain lower food resources and more abundant nesting sites possibly to avoid contact with other squirrels while raising the young.

Southern flying squirrels nest in natural cavities and woodpecker holes, or build nest out of leaves and twigs. Leaf nests are used as a refuge or a resting site and are used primarily in summer, whereas cavities are used for breeding and more intensively during winter. Cavities used by southern flying squirrels are found in small snags, average 23.27 cm (9.16 in) in diameter at breast height, or large living trees, average 50.42 cm (19.85 in) dbh, with entrances that average 4.7 cm (1.9 in) in width by 9.4 cm (3.7 in) in height, which are an average of 6.36 m (20.9 ft) above the ground.

Dens tend to be on the perimeter of the home range and situated away from clearings. To cross disturbances such as plantations and logged areas, southern flying squirrels prefer to use mature forest corridors over younger ones, suggesting that they are more sensitive to forest disturbances than previously believed.

== Behavior ==
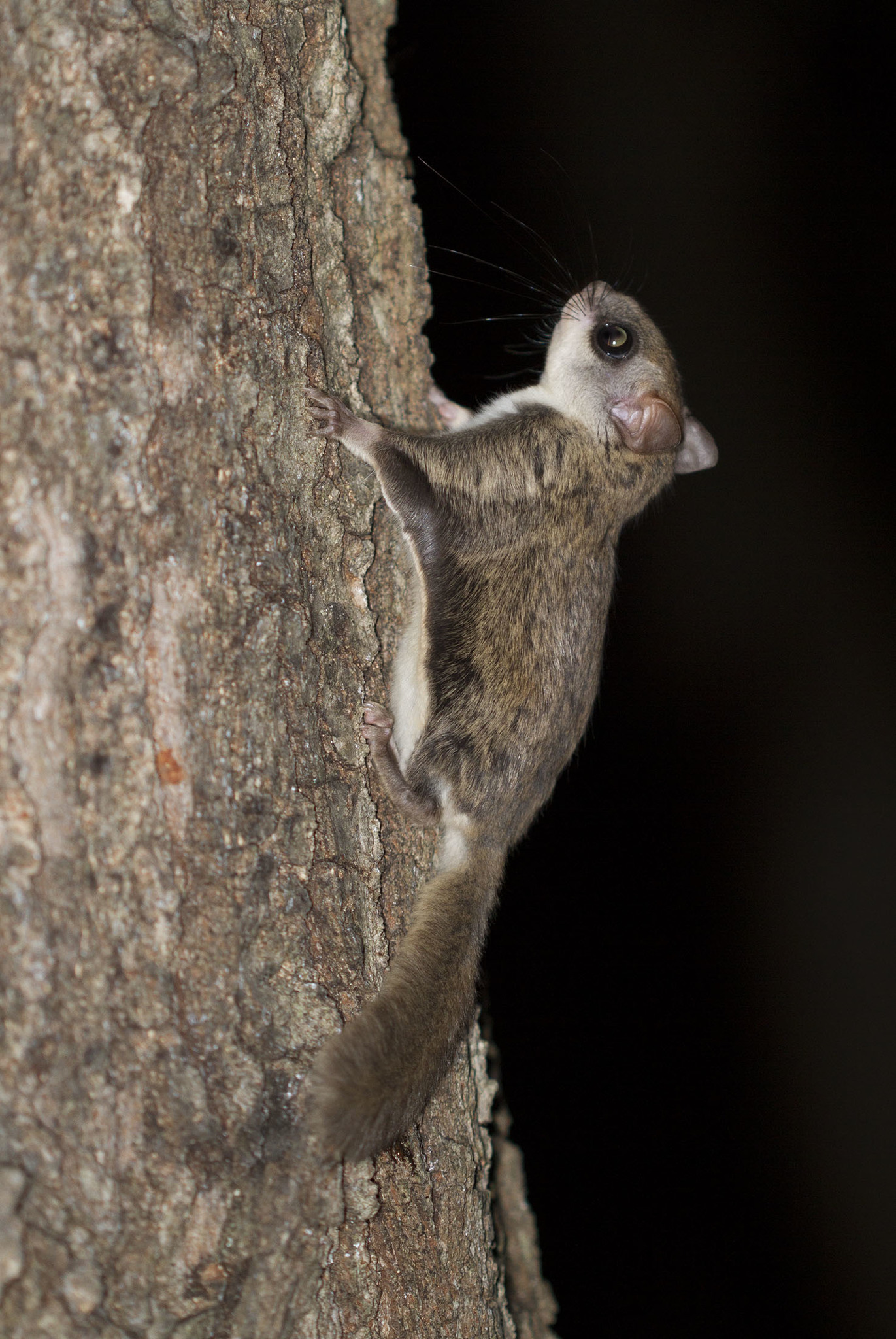
In Connecticut, USA

Southern flying squirrels are highly social mammals and have been observed flying and foraging together in large groups. Additionally, they often aggregate together in dens, especially as seasonal temperatures decline in order to conserve energy. Compared to individuals who nest alone in winter, squirrels in aggregates can save 30 percent more energy. Although southern flying squirrels do show a preference for relatedness, they are tolerant of nonrelated but familiar individuals, possibly because in addition to providing heat energy for the aggregation, outsiders will promote outbreeding. However, in the summer months, they tend to forage and cache alone in their home range.

Muul stated that communal nesting may be detrimental during warm weather and is unnecessary in the southern parts of the species range. However, Layne and Raymond observed nest boxes in Florida and discovered that the southern populations also nest in large groups (up to 25 individuals) and that, compared to northern populations, the period of elevated communal nesting extended later in the spring. In this study, nest temperatures occasionally exceeded 38 °C (100 °F) while the normal body temperature of southern flying squirrels varies between 36.3 and 38.9 °C (97.3 and 102.0 °F). Since southern populations breed later in the spring than northern populations, these findings suggests that communal nesting serves more than a thermoregulatory function and may actually play a role in the social organization of populations. Proposed advantages of aggregation include increased likelihood of mating, increased defense against predators, or increased foraging success.

Populations which nest together were found to be more highly related than expected by chance and it is believed that this could be a form of kin selection since an individual's stored food may be beneficial for the survival of its relatives in the event of death.

Winterrowd and Weigl performed experiments in controlled conditions to determine whether memory, smell, random searching, or problem solving played a major role in retrieving hidden food. When burying dry nuts in dry substrate, no odors are present and spatial memory is the most effective retrieval mechanism, suggesting that there is no inclusive fitness involved in the hoarding behavior. However, once placed in a wet environment, smell becomes an effective means to retrieve the food and decreases the individuals' advantage over the other members of the group. Experiments to determine whether a squirrel would steal from others in the group revealed that no particular pattern exists and that the hidden food is recovered according to its availability.

== Sports and popular culture ==
- Richmond Flying Squirrels - Eastern League affiliate of the San Francisco Giants. This Virginia-based team draws its name, logo, and mascot from the southern flying squirrel.
- The video games Pokémon Black and White take place in the Unova region (based on the eastern United States) and contain Emolga, an Electric/Flying type Pokémon based on the southern flying squirrel.
- The animated television series The Adventures of Rocky and Bullwinkle and Friends features the anthropomorphic flying squirrel Rocket J. ("Rocky") Squirrel.
- The animated film Little Nemo: Adventures in Slumberland features a flying squirrel named Icarus who is Nemo's pet.
