= Spite (sentiment) =

Intentionally harming others without self-benefit

Spite or spitefulness refers to action derived from, or a tendency to engage in malevolence. Spitefulness is a general personality trait which refers to the capacity and desire to harm others, specifically due to no clear and overt cause. Vindictiveness is not a hallmark of this spitefulness, because then it may be justified, or be derived from an identifiable cause: spitefulness refers to a general desire to cause harm. Further, spite can often be traced back to envy, as the bitterness of one's disposition is the main identifier of this mental state.

According to the American Psychological Association there is "no standard definition of spitefulness. Spite can be broadly defined to include any vindictive or mean-spirited actions. Alternatively, a narrower definition includes the requirement that spiteful acts involve some degree of self-harm." One possible definition of spite is to intentionally annoy, hurt, or upset even when there might be no (apparent) gain, and even when those actions might cause the person spiting harm, as well. Spite has been theorized also as productive. Spiteful words or actions are delivered in such a way that it is clear that the person is delivering them just to annoy, hurt, or upset.

In his 1929 examination of emotional disturbances, Psychology and Morals: An Analysis of Character, J. A. Hadfield uses deliberately spiteful acts to illustrate the difference between disposition and sentiment.

== In psychology ==
Spite has also been studied as a trait of human personality; although in general spite has been largely ignored in academic literature. University of Washington researchers David K Marcus, Virgil Zeigler-Hill, Sterett H Mercer, and Alyssa L Norris were the first to develop a personality scale designed to measure and assess the trait of spitefulness which was published in 2014 in Psychological Assessment.

In his 1929 examination of emotional disturbances, Psychology and Morals: An Analysis of Character, J. A. Hadfield uses deliberately spiteful acts to illustrate the difference between disposition and sentiment.

== See also ==
- Cruelty
- Cutting off the nose to spite the face
- The Dog in the Manger
- Sadism
- Spite (game theory)
- Schadenfreude
- Spite fence
- Spite house
