= Hamiltonian spite =

Spiteful behaviour in animals

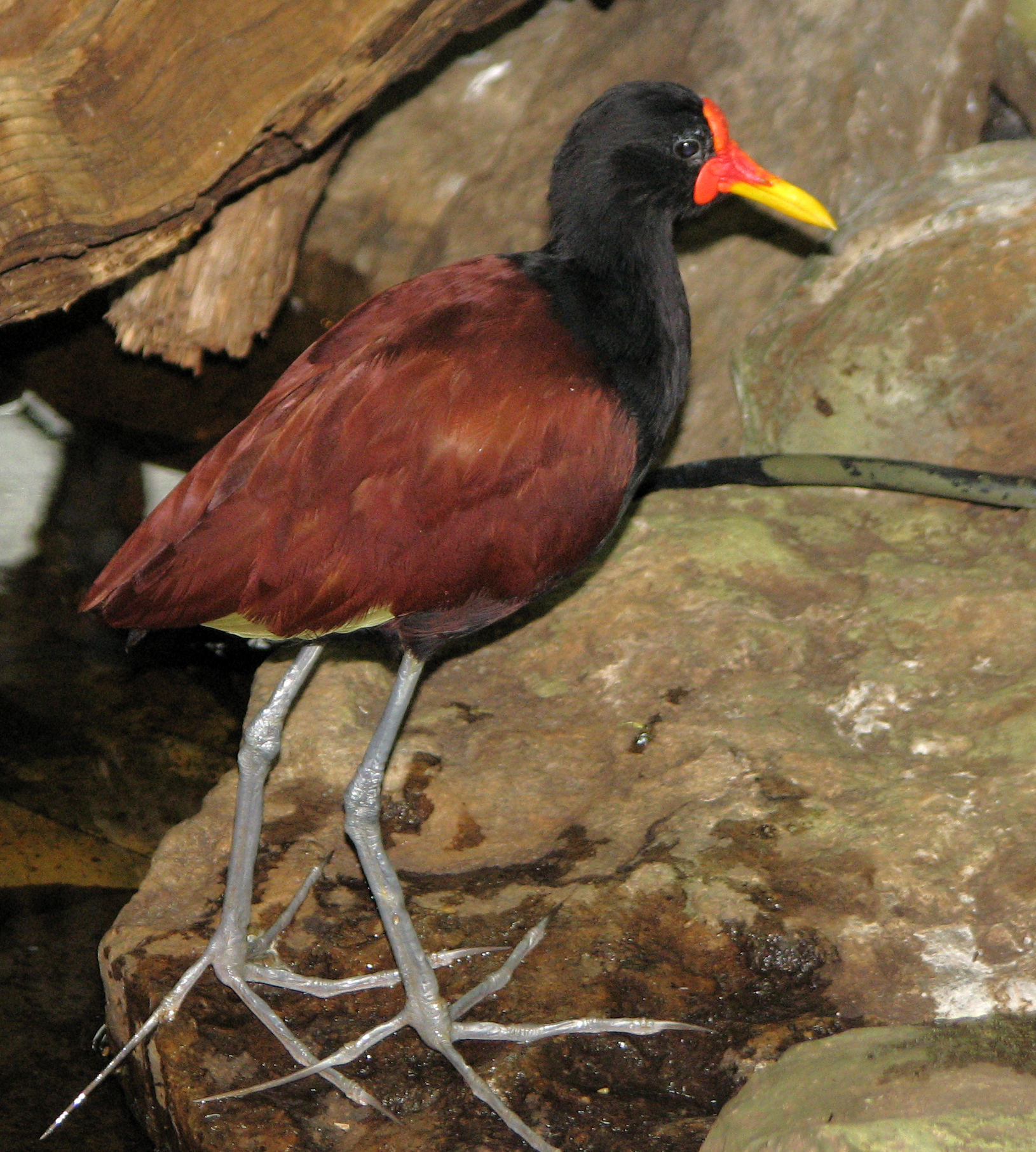
Female wattled jacanas often carry out infanticide.

Within the field of social evolution, Hamiltonian spite is a term introduced by W. D. Hamilton for spiteful behaviors occurring among conspecifics that have a cost for the actor and a negative impact upon the recipient.

== Theories on altruism and spitefulness ==
W. D. Hamilton published an influential paper on altruism in 1964 to explain why genetic kin tend to help each other. He argued that genetically related individuals are likely to carry the copies of the same alleles; thus, helping kin may ensure that copies of the actors' alleles pass on to next generations of both the recipient and the actor.

While this became a widely accepted idea, it was less noted that Hamilton published a later paper that modified this view. This paper argues that by measuring the genetic relatedness between any two (randomly chosen) individuals of a population several times, we can identify an average level of relatedness. Theoretical models predict that (1) it is adaptive for an individual to be altruistic to any other individuals that are more closely related to it than this average level, and also that (2) it is adaptive for an individual to be spiteful against any other individuals that are less closely related to it than this average level. The indirect adaptive benefits of such acts can surpass certain costs of the act (either helpful or harmful) itself. Hamilton mentioned birds and fishes exhibiting infanticide (more specifically: ovicide) as examples for such behaviors.

Briefly, an individual can increase the chance of its genetic alleles to be passed to the next generations either by helping those that are more closely related, or by harming those that are less closely related than relationship by chance.

== Doubts about the adaptive nature of spiteful behavior ==
Though altruism and spitefulness appear to be two sides of the same coin, the latter is less accepted among evolutionary biologists.

First, unlike the case with the beneficiary of an altruistic act, targets of aggression are likely to act in revenge: bites will provoke bites. Thus harming non-kin may be more costly than helping kin.

Second, presuming a panmictic population, the vast majority of pairs of individuals exhibit a roughly average level of relatedness. For a given individual, the majority of others are not worth helping or harming. While it is easy to identify the few most closely related ones (see: kin recognition), it is hard to identify the most genetically distant ones.

Most terrestrial vertebrates exhibit a certain degree of site fidelity, so levels of kinship tend to correlate negatively with spatial distance. While this may provide some cues to identify the least related individuals, it may also ensure that non-kin rarely if ever meet each other.

== Spiteful behavior in animals ==
=== Infanticide ===
Many animal species exhibit infanticide, i.e. adults tend to kill the eggs or the offspring of conspecifics, even if they do not feed on them (in the absence of cannibalism). This form of spitefulness is relatively free from the threat of revenge – provided that the parents and relatives of the target are either weak or far away. Infanticide may not be a form of spite as in many cases the loss of offspring to the female brings it back into estrous providing a mating advantage to an infanticidal male. This is seen in lions.

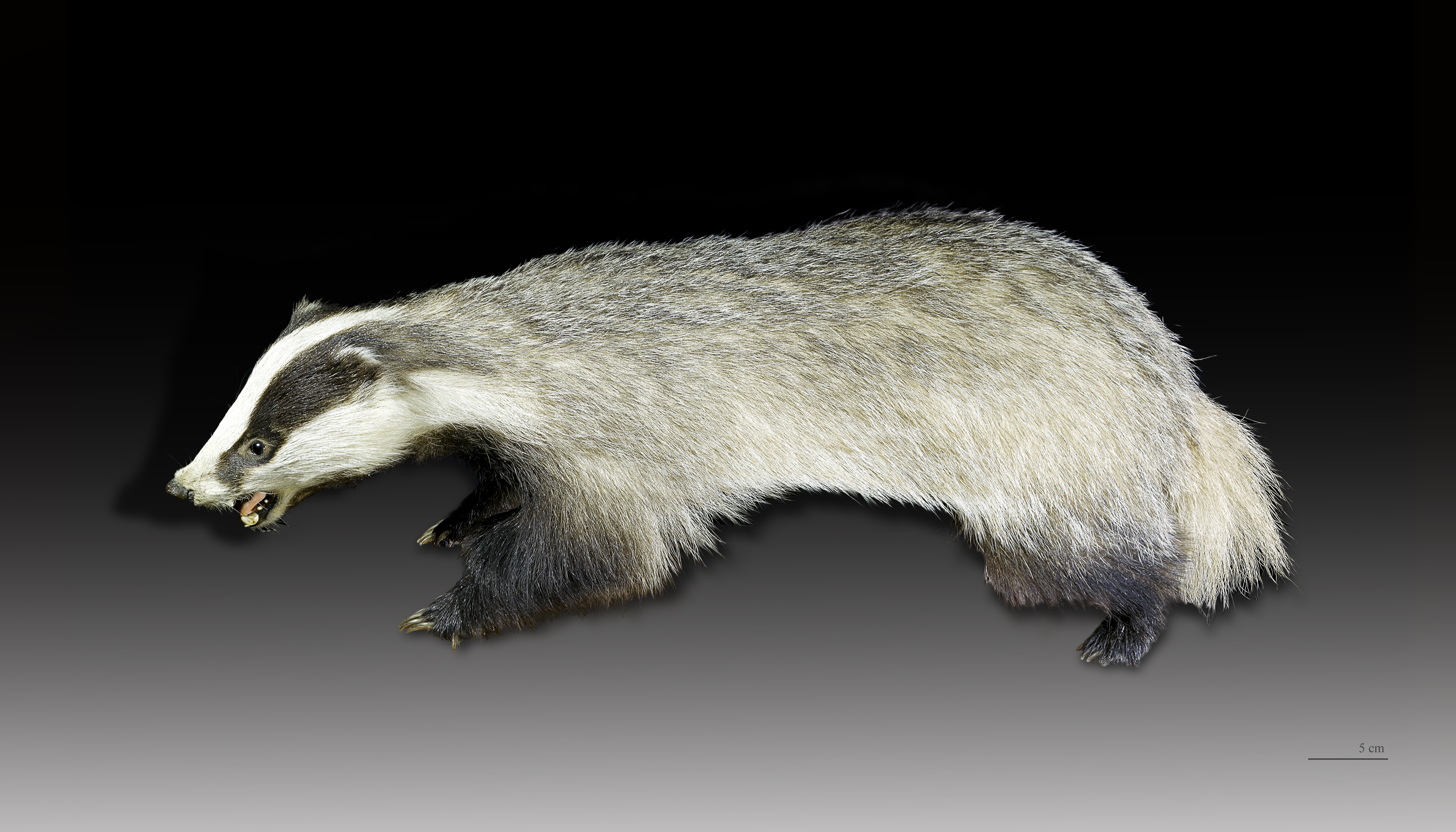
When infected by tuberculosis, badgers emigrate from their natal group.

=== Aggression by means of pathogens ===
An individual carrying a long-lasting infection of virulent pathogens may benefit from (1) channelling the flow of pathogens from its own body away from its kin and (2) directing them toward non-kin conspecifics. The adaptive nature of this behavior has been supported by the analysis of theoretical models and also by the analyses of the behavioral repertoire of different animal species. Thus, tuberculosis-infected European badgers and rabies-infected dogs equally tend to emigrate from their natal ranges before starting to distribute the pathogens. Similarly, wild herds of Asian elephants tend to defecate into drinkwater holes apparently to keep rival herds away.

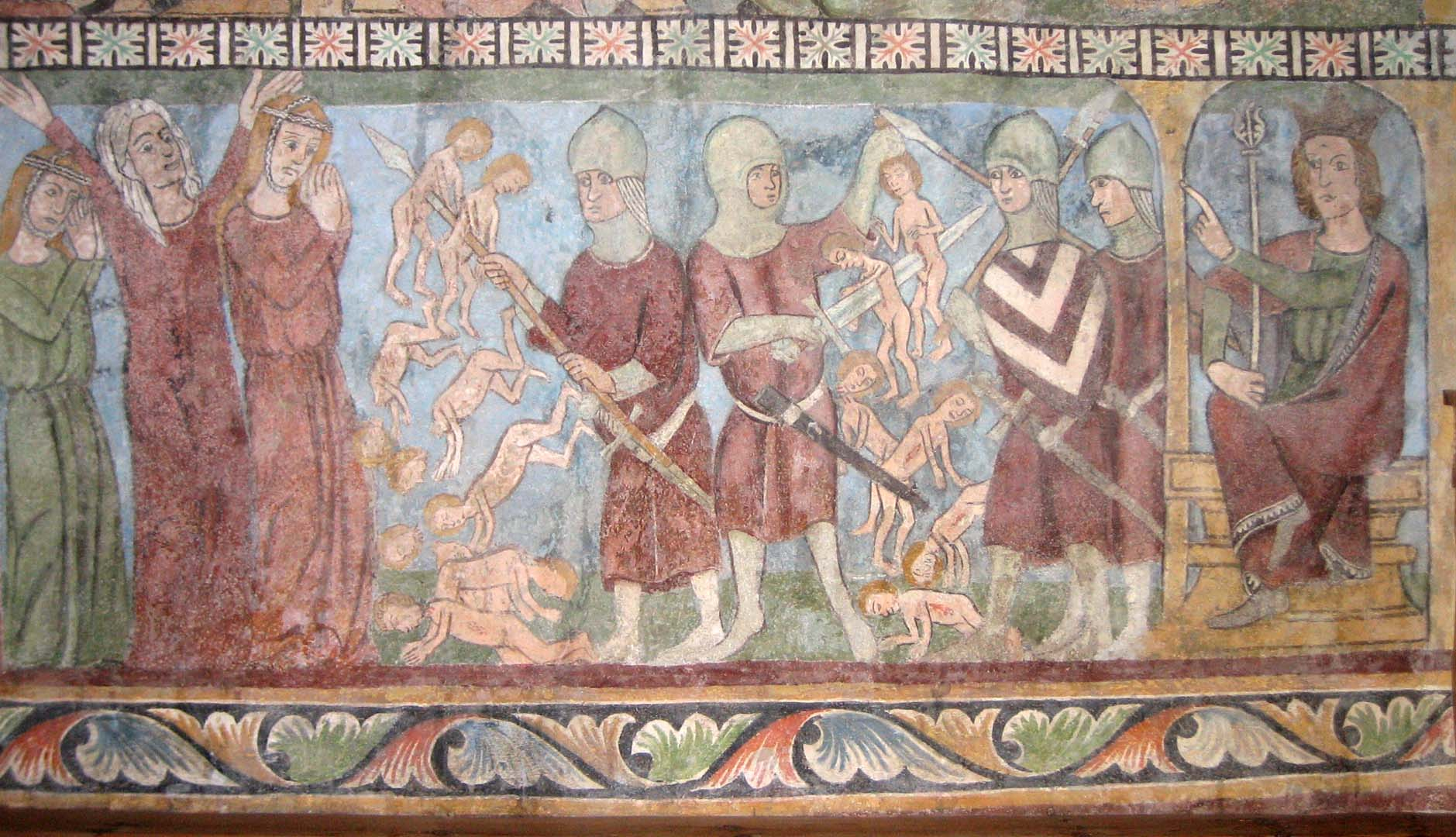
Depiction of Herod's alleged infanticide from a church in Lüen.

== Spiteful behavior in humans ==
=== Wartime infanticide ===
Throughout human history, war has often emerged as a costly form of aggression, typically targeting the non-kin enemy. Naturally, most wars appear to be motivated by potential benefits other than the genetic. Nevertheless, widespread infanticide during periods of war indicates Hamiltonian elements as well. Infanticide is a biologically spiteful action in that it costs the killer time and energy, and opens the killer to the threat of revenge, without any direct compensating benefits.

== See also ==
- Kin selection
