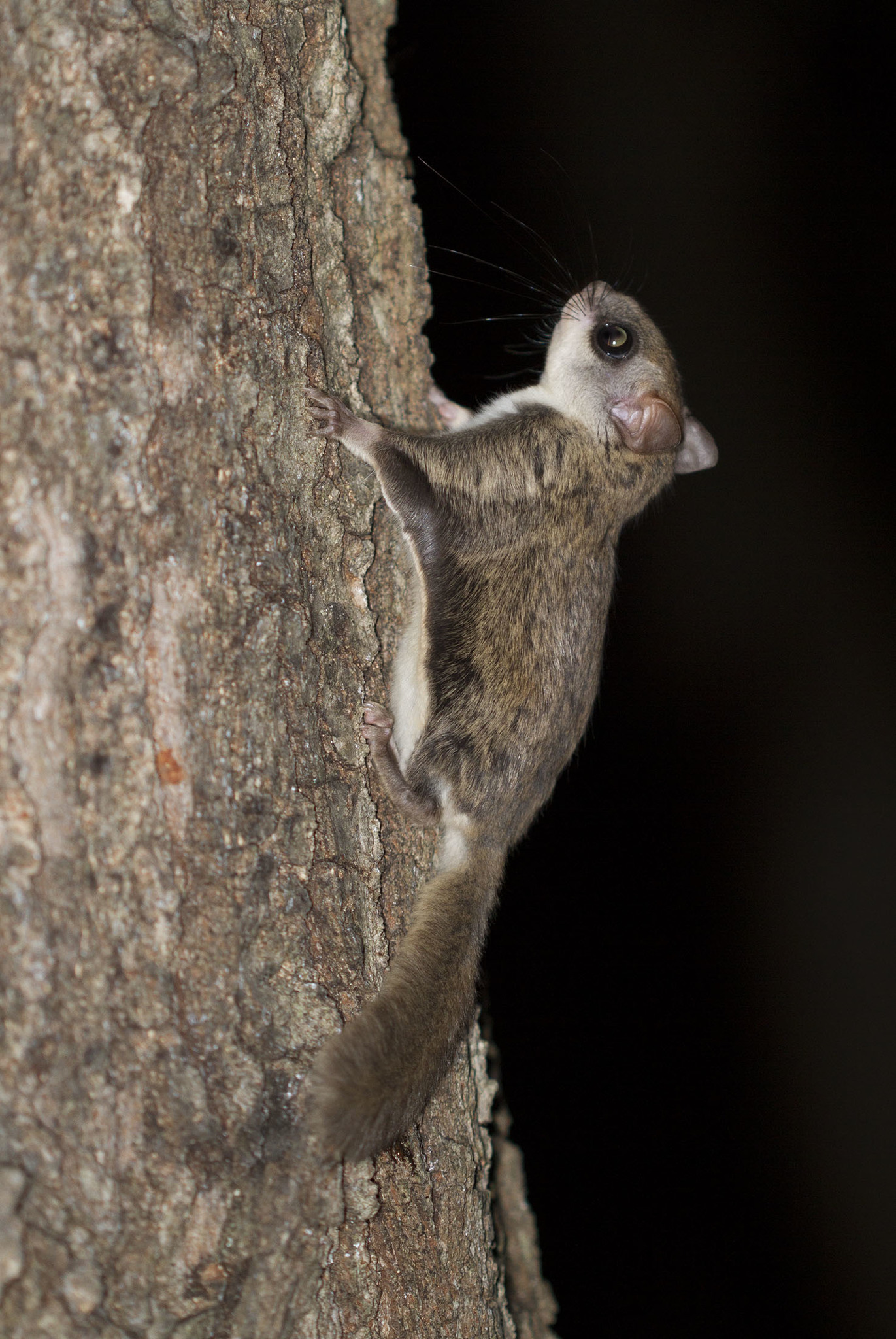
- Southern flying squirrel (Glaucomys volans)

Scientific classification
- Kingdom: Animalia
- Phylum: Chordata
- Class: Mammalia
- Order: Rodentia
- Family: Sciuridae
- Tribe: Pteromyini
- Genus: Glaucomys; Thomas, 1908

Type species
- Mus volans

Species
- Glaucomys volans Glaucomys sabrinus Glaucomys oregonensis
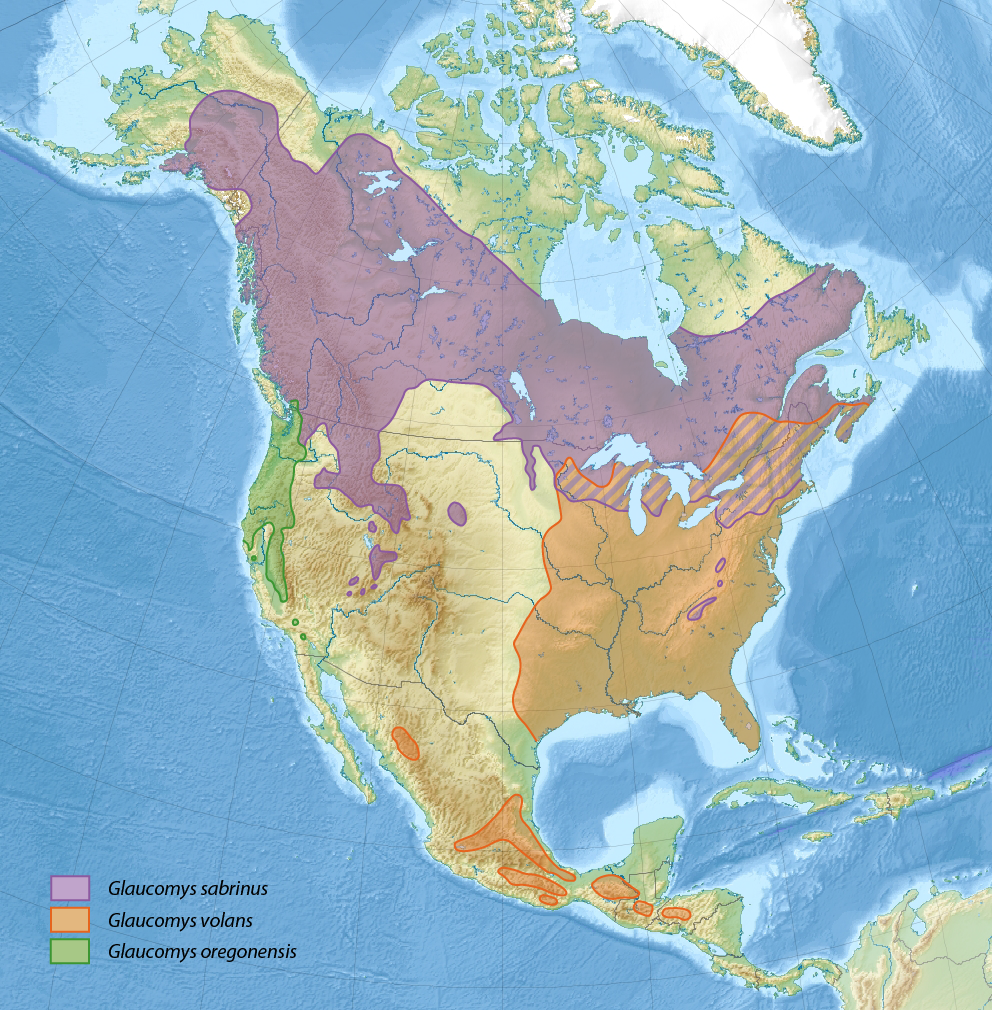

= New World flying squirrel =

New World flying squirrels Temporal range: Middle Pleistocene - Recent

Genus of rodents

The three species of New World flying squirrels, in the genus Glaucomys, are the only species of flying squirrel found in North America. They are distributed from Alaska to Honduras. They are similar in many ways to the Eurasian flying squirrels in the genus Pteromys. Two species of New World flying squirrels can be easily distinguished on the basis of size and ventral pelage. Northern flying squirrels, Glaucomys sabrinus are larger and have belly hair that is dark at the base and white at the tip. Southern flying squirrels, Glaucomys volans, are smaller and have belly hairs that are completely white. Humboldt's flying squirrel is more difficult to distinguish from the northern flying squirrel where their ranges overlap. In fact, they were once considered conspecific. Humboldt's flying squirrel is considered a cryptic species. They are generally smaller and darker than northern flying squirrels.

== Species ==
Genus Glaucomys – Thomas, 1908 – three species
Common name	Scientific name and subspecies	Range	Size and ecology	IUCN status and estimated population
Humboldt's flying squirrel	Glaucomys oregonensis (Bachman, 1839)	California	Size: Habitat: Diet:	
Northern flying squirrel	Glaucomys sabrinus (Shaw, 1801) Twenty five subspecies: G. s. sabrinus; G. s. alpinus; G. s. bangsi; G. s. californcus; G. s. canescens; G. s. coloratus; G. s. columbiensis; G. s. flaviventris; G. s. fuliginosus; G. s. fuscus; G. s. goodwini; G. s. gouldi; G. s. griseifrons; G. s. klamathensis; G. s. lascivus; G. s. latipes; G. s. lucifugus; G. s. macrotis; G. s. makkovikensis; G. s. murinauralis; G. s. reductus; G. s. sabrinus; G. s. stephensi; G. s. yukonensis; G. s. zaphaeus	North America.	Size: Habitat: Diet:	LC
Southern flying squirrel	Glaucomys volans (Linnaeus, 1758) Eleven subspecies: G. v. volans; G. v. chontali; G. v. goldmani; G. v. guerreroensis; G. v. herreranus; G. v. madrensis; G. v. oaxacensis; G. v. querceti; G. v. saturatus; G. v. texensis; G. v. underwoodi	North America, Mexico, Guatemala, and Honduras.	Size: Habitat: Diet:	LC

== Gliding ==
Flying squirrels do not actually fly, but rather glide using a membrane called a patagium created by a fold of skin which starts at the wrists of the forearms, extends along the sides of the body, and finishes at the ankles of the hind legs. From atop of trees, flying squirrels can initiate glides from a running start or from a stationary position by bringing their limbs under the body, retracting their heads, and then propelling themselves off the tree. It is believed that they use triangulation to estimate the distance of the landing area as they often lean out and pivot from side to side before jumping. Once in the air, they form an "X" with their limbs by spreading their long arms forward and out and their long legs backward and out, causing their membrane to stretch into a square-like shape and glide down at angles of 30 to 40 degrees. They manoeuvre with great efficiency in the air, making 90 degree turns around obstacles if needed. Just before reaching a tree, they raise their flattened tails to abruptly change their trajectory upwards and point all of their limbs forward in order to create a parachute effect with the membrane. Upon landing, the limbs break the remainder of the impact and the squirrels usually run to the other side of the trunk in order to avoid any potential predators. They are very clumsy walkers and if they are on the ground in the presence of danger, they will prefer to hide rather than attempt an escape.

== Fluorescence ==
Under ultraviolet light, females and males of all 3 species of Glaucomys fluoresce in varying intensities of pink on both dorsal and ventral surfaces. The fluorescence is hypothesized to help the flying squirrels find each other in low light and mimic the plumage of owls to evade predation. This hypothesis has been challenged by Toussaint et al. (2022) who instead suggest that the pink luminescence is a byproduct of the body's waste management. Moreover, these authors argue that it is far from evident that UV illuminating sources that occur naturally are sufficient to elicit luminescence distinguishable from ambient visible light. An ecological role for the pink luminescence is therefore not likely.
