= Fisher's geometric model =

Fisher's geometric model (FGM) is an evolutionary model of the effect sizes and effect on fitness of spontaneous mutations proposed by Ronald Fisher to explain the distribution of effects of mutations that could contribute to adaptative evolution.

== Conceptualization ==
Sometimes referred to as the Fisher–Orr model, Fisher's model addresses the problem of adaptation (and, to some extent, complexity), and continues to be a point of reference in contemporary research on the genetic and evolutionary consequences of pleiotropy.

The model has two forms, a geometric formalism, and a microscope analogy. A microscope which has many knobs to adjust the lenses to obtain a sharp image has little chance of obtaining an optimally functioning image by randomly turning the knobs. The chances of a clear image are not so bad if the number of knobs is low, but the chances will decrease dramatically if the number of adjustable parameters (knobs) is larger than two or three. Fisher introduced a geometric metaphor, which eventually became known as Fisher's geometric model.

In his model, Fisher argues that the functioning of the microscope is analogous to the fitness of an organism. The performance of the microscope depends on the state of various knobs that can be manipulated, corresponding to distances and orientations of various lenses, whereas the fitness of an organism depends on the state of various phenotypic character such as body size and beak length and depth. The increase in the fitness of an organism by random changes is then analogous to the attempt to improve the performance of a microscope through randomly changing the positions of the knobs on the microscope.

The analogy between the microscope and an evolving organism can be formalized by representing the phenotype of an organism as a point in a high-dimensional data space, where the dimensions of that space correspond to the traits of the organism. The more independent dimensions of variation the phenotype has, the more difficult is improvement resulting from random changes. If there are many different ways to change a phenotype it becomes very unlikely that a random change affects the right combination of traits in the right way to improve fitness. Fisher noted that the smaller the effect, the higher the chance that a change is beneficial. At one extreme, changes with infinitesimally small effect have a 50% chance of improving fitness. This argument led to the widely held position that evolution proceeds by small mutations.

Furthermore, Orr discovered that both the fixation probability of a beneficial mutation and the fitness gain that is conferred by the fixation of the beneficial mutation decrease with organismal complexity. Thus, the predicted rate of adaptation decreases quickly with the rise in organismal complexity, a theoretical finding known as the ‘cost of complexity’.
