= Group living =

Concept in ethology and evolutionary biology

In ethology and evolutionary biology, group living is defined as individuals of the same species (conspecifics), maintaining spatial proximity with one another over time with mechanisms of social attraction. Solitary life in animals is considered to be the ancestral state of living; and group living has thus evolved independently in many species of animals. Therefore, species that form groups through social interaction will result in a group of individuals that gain an evolutionary advantage, such as increased protection against predators, access to potential mates, increased foraging efficiency and the access to social information.

Important aspects of group living include the frequency and type of social interactions (egoistic, cooperative, altruistic, revengeful) between individuals of a group (social life), the group size, and the organization of group members in the group.

Terminology of animal groups also varies among different taxonomic groups. Groups of sheep are termed herds, whilst groups of birds are referred to as colonies, or flocks.

Most studies on group living focus strictly on groups comprising a single species. However, many mixed-species groups commonly occur in nature. Examples of mixed-species groups include wildebeests forming groups with zebras, and different species of birds that form large foraging flocks.

Group living may sometimes be confused with collective animal behavior. Collective animal behavior is the study of how the interactions between individuals of a group give rise to group level patterns and how these patterns have evolved. Examples include the marching of locusts and flocks of migrating birds. Group living however focuses on the long-term social interactions between individuals of a group and how animals have evolved from solitary living.

== Definition of group living ==
It is extremely difficult to distinguish between solitary living and group living. Distinctions between the two are relatively artificial. This is because many species of animals who spend a majority of their life alone, at some point in their life, will join a group or engage in social behavior. Some examples of this happens during mating, parental care of their offspring, or even aggregations of conspecifics to an area to exploit resources of food or shelter. Therefore, multiple definitions of group living have been proposed. Differences in group living definitions vary dependent on the frequency and type of social interactions that members of a group display and the level of coordination and cohesion of group members. For example, Wilson (2000) defines a group as “any set of organisms, belonging to the same species, that remain together for a period of time while interacting with one another to a distinctly greater degree than with other conspecific organisms." This definition cannot be applied to situations such as moths drawn to a lamp, or when animals aggregate around a watering hole, as they are not exampling of a social aggregation. Most definitions however agree that a fundamental characteristic of group living is that individuals need to show spatial proximity over time to be considered a group. Therefore, the working definition of group living is where two or more individuals display a degree of spatial proximity over time, emphasizing the importance of mechanisms of social attraction to maintain these groups.

== Evolution of group living ==
There have been multiple different hypotheses proposed to explain how group living evolved in animals. Research shows that grouping habits may differ between individuals, and this tendency to group can be inherited. Research also shows that grouping tendency depends heavily on the interaction of many genes, as well as experiences gained by an individual and the environmental conditions surrounding the individual. Other studies argue that the main driving force of the evolution of social grouping is phylogenetic inertia alongside ecological pressure. However, it is still unclear how exactly animals have evolved from the ancestral state of solitary life.

== Benefits of group living ==
=== Information access and transfer ===
A key advantage to group living is the ability for individuals in a group to access information gained by other group members. This ability to share information can benefit many aspects of a group’s success, such as increased foraging efficiency and increased defenses against predators.

=== Foraging efficiency ===
An advantage of information access from group living is increased foraging efficiency. When individuals form a group, they can more effectively locate high quality resources in their environment. Foraging efficiency can be increased by the sheer area of space individuals occupy as well as a greater number of individuals searching for food. Once a high-quality resource is found, the individuals may produce signals or cues that guides other members of the group to the location of the resource. The cues and signals produced thus helps individuals of a group discriminate between low- and high-quality resources. An example of this information transfer to benefit foraging efficiency can be seen in honey-bee (Apis mellifera) colonies, in which waggle dances performed by honey-bees share information on where these dancing bees foraged nectar. The waggle dance thus guides other bees to the location of highly productive flowers. In some species, for instance the forest tent caterpillar (Malacosoma disstria), foraging behaviors change depending on food source. On less favorable food sources, caterpillar groups tend to splinter, thereby potentially increasing the risk for predation, but increasing the potential of finding a more favorable food source.

=== Increased defense from predators ===
Another advantage of living in a group is seen in many prey species in their ability to increase defenses against predatory animals.

A way that a group may increase its defenses against predators is through the ‘many-eyes effect’. This effect states that larger groups of animals are better at detecting predators compared to smaller groups. This allows the individuals within a group to more effectively identify predators, allowing these individuals to flee or adopt postures to alert the predators that their presence is known. An example can be seen in a study conducted by Siegfried and Underhill (1975) on laughing doves, in which large groups react to a mock-predator much more rapidly than smaller groups.

Another way in which a group may have decreased risk of predation is through the dilution effect. The dilution effect shows the idea that an individual in a large group will have a reduced risk of predation compared to an individual in a small group or a solitary individual. Hence the risk is ‘diluted’ among the other members in a group. This effect only occurs where predators are unable to capture all individuals in a group. For example, a flock of birds preying on a large group of caterpillars will not have any dilution effect, as these birds can rapidly consume all caterpillars at once. All individuals in a large group however, may not benefit from the dilution effect, and thus the selfish herd theory was developed. The selfish herd theory states that individuals in the periphery of a group is more likely to be preyed upon than those in the center of the group

=== Breeding ===
It is hypothesized that reproductive success of a female is determined by the number of eggs she can produce, while reproductive success of a male is determined by the number of females he mates with. Furthermore, according to Bateman's principle, it is expected that females of a population will select mates that result in the best quality offspring, while males compete among each other to mate with a female.

Group living provides the presence of social information within the group, allowing both male and female members to find and select potential mating partners. Alongside this, living in a group allows for higher reproductive success as individuals have access to a greater number of potential mates, and the possibility to choose between them. Therefore, individuals living in groups have a higher chance of finding a mate and successfully reproducing, on the basis that larger groups present a greater number of accessible mates nearby.

== Costs of group living ==
Despite the many benefits of living in groups, individuals of the group may also incur costs when forming groups.

=== Ectoparasitism and disease ===
When individuals of the same species aggregate to form groups, there is an increased risk of diseases and parasites spreading throughout the group. Because individuals of a group live together in close proximity, when one individual is infected with a disease or parasite, they bring this disease or parasite into a habitat full of susceptible individuals. Also, larger groups of animals will produce larger amounts of waste material, allowing for a favorable environment for pathogens, that may spread to individuals. Thus, transmissions of diseases and parasites are more likely to occur and more rapidly than if an individual lived alone. A great example was shown in colonies of cliff swallows by Brown and Brown (1986). Cliff swallows are commonly parasitized by swallow bugs and this study showed that the number of swallow bugs per nest increased significantly with an increase of the number of cliff swallows per colony, which thus reduced the survivability of the nests’ offspring by up to 50%. Another study shows that bank swallows have an increased likelihood of flea infestations per burrow with the increase of colony size, which also increased mortality rates of offspring in infected burrows.

=== Intraspecific competition ===
A consequence that may arise from forming large groups is the increased intraspecific competition between group members. If resources in a group’s environment becomes limited, group members will then have to compete with one another for the available resources. The increased competition then results in reduced nutritional intake in some individuals compared to others. An example of this can be seen in a study conducted on leaf monkeys. This study showed that females in a larger group of leaf monkeys had a reduced energetic intake than females in groups of smaller sizes. The reduction in energy gain seen in females of the larger group also then negatively affected the development rates of any infant offspring. Therefore, despite the benefits of animals forming groups that increases foraging efficiency due to the presence of social information, large groups of animals may also incur a cost of having to compete for the resources available in the environment.

=== Reproduction ===
Another cost to group living is the effect that a larger group size has on the reproductive success of individuals.

While forming groups may benefit the reproductive success of individuals as there are more potential mates, consequentially individuals may also have increased competition between one another to successfully find a mate and reproduce. This means some individuals will have a reduction in their reproductive success as it now competes with other group members. An example can be seen in a study conducted on the Eurasian badger (Meles meles). This study showed that females belonging to a large group of badgers had a higher failure rate of reproduction in comparison to badgers living in solitary. Therefore, some individuals may actually show reduced reproductive success while living in a group despite the increased presence of potential mates.

=== Stress ===
It is clear that animals that form groups need to maintain a group size around an optimal level. Individual group members in group sizes much larger or smaller than the optimum may have increased stress levels. Individuals in groups much larger than their optimum group size may have increased stress levels due to competition for food resources or mates. In contrast, individuals in groups smaller than their optimum have increased stress levels arising from inadequate defense from predators. An example of this can be seen in a study conducted on a species of ring-tailed lemurs (Lemur catta). This study predicted that the optimum group size of ring-tailed lemurs is 10-20 individuals. The study then showed that groups within the optimum group size produced the lowest level of cortisol (an indicator of stress), while groups larger or smaller than the optimum group size had a significant increase in cortisol production. Therefore, group sizes that are not maintained within their optimum size may incur a cost of increased stress levels of individuals within those groups.

=== Inbreeding ===
Another proposed cost of group living is the increased risk of inbreeding. As members of the group in close proximity to one another over long periods of time, this increases the chances that offspring of the group may mate with related individuals. Offspring resulting from inbreeding have an increased chance to be affected by recessive or deleterious traits, thus reducing its survivability and ability to reproduce. The risk of inbreeding however, is only prevalent in smaller, isolated groups, as larger group sizes dilutes the chance of an individual mating with its relatives.
