= Mercenary marriage =

Mercenary marriage may refer to:

- Bride-buying
- Wife selling
