= Bride buying =

Trade of purchasing a bride

Bride buying or bride purchasing is the cultural practice of providing some form of payment in exchange for a bride. The payment may be made to the bride's father, family, or a separate agent. It is the converse of a dowry. Illegal in some countries, it has a firm foothold in parts of Asia and Africa. It may amount to a form of slavery when treated as a transfer of property from one "owner" to another.

== History ==
In his History, Herodotus reports approvingly of the former Babylonian and Illyrian custom of holding an annual auction of each village's young women reaching marriageable age. He states that the high price of the healthiest and most beautiful was used in part to fund dowries for the ugliest and most crippled, each of the latter being given to the man who would legitimately marry them for the least amount. Despite his praise, he acknowledges the Babylonians discontinued the practice owing to mistreatment of brides, particularly those bought by outsiders, and says that since the Fall of Babylon to the Persian Empire the general poverty of the country had led to many fathers prostituting their daughters instead of auctioning or marrying them off.

One of the first recorded instances of bride-buying in North America can be traced back to 1619 in Jamestown, Virginia. The first Jamestown settlers were exclusively European males, historian Alf J. Mapp Jr believes this could be due to the belief that "...women had no place in the grim and often grisly business of subduing a continent..." With stories of famine, disease and dissension, the European women feared that leaving England and traveling to the colony would be of great risk. The Virginia Company offered women who chose to leave England in favor of the colony generous incentives such as linens, clothing, a plot of land, and their choice of husband. After a husband was chosen, he would then pay the Virginia Company with 150 pounds (70kg) of "good leaf" tobacco to pay for their bride's passage to the colony. This is how the Jamestown brides earned themselves the nickname the "tobacco brides".

== Mail-order brides ==
One of the most common forms of modern-day bride-buying is mail-order brides. It is estimated that there are 90 agencies that deal with the selling and purchasing of mail order brides. These agencies have websites that list the addresses, pictures, names and biographies of up to 25,000 women that are seeking husbands, with American husbands being the most common preference. This fact is also proved by personal stories and experiences of men who have married foreign women. While there are women listed on these sites from all over the world, the majority of mail-order brides come from Russia and the Philippines. According to these agencies, 10% of women who choose to become mail-order brides are successful and find a husband through their services. The agencies also state that there are around 10,000 mail-order marriages a year, with about 4,000 of these marriages involving men in the United States.

== Bride-buying in Asia ==
=== China ===
Bride-buying is an old tradition in China. The practice was largely stamped out by the current Chinese Communist government. However, the modern practice is "not unusual in rural villages"; it is also known as mercenary marriage. According to Ding Lu of the non-governmental organization All-China Women's Federation, the practice had a resurgence due to China's surging economy. From 1991 to 1996, Chinese police rescued upwards of 88,000 women and children who had been sold into marriage and slavery, and the Chinese government claimed that 143,000 traffickers involved were caught and prosecuted. Some human rights groups state that these figures are not correct and that the real number of abducted women is higher. Bay Fang and Mark Leong reported in U.S. News & World Report that "the government sees the commerce in wives as a shameful problem, it has only in recent years begun to provide any statistics, and it tries to put the focus on the women who have been saved rather than on the continuing trade." Causes include poverty and bride shortage in the rural areas (rural women go to the cities to work). As women leave rural areas to find work in cities, they are considered more vulnerable to being "tricked or forced into becoming chattel for men desperate for wives." The shortage of brides in turn is due to amplification of the traditional preference of Chinese couples for sons by the 1979 one-child policy in China. The Chinese Academy of Social Sciences estimated that in 1998 there were 120 men for every 100 women, with imbalances in rural areas being about 130 males for every 100 females. The increase in the cost of dowries is also a contributing factor leading men to buy women for wives. Human Rights in China states that it is more affordable for a man to buy a wife from a trafficker for 2,000 to 4,000 yuan than to pay a traditional dowry, which often runs upwards of 10,000 yuan. For the average urban worker, wife selling is an affordable option, since in 1998 at least; China urban workers made approximately $60 a month. Brides for sale are outsourced from countries such as Burma, Laos, Pakistan, Vietnam and North Korea. The bride-traders sell women as brides or as prostitutes depending on their physical appearance. A common trick employed by bride-brokers in acquiring brides for sale is the offer of a job such as in factories and instead kidnapping them. Bride-traders can sell a young woman for the price of $250 to $800USD. US$50 to US$100 of the original price goes to the primary kidnappers while the rest of the income goes to the traffickers who bring the bride to the main client.

After bearing children, Chinese women who are bought as wives are more prone to staying within the marriage. Fang Yuzhu of the China Women's Federation credits it with a "strong sense of duty" that Chinese women have, and the idea that it is shameful to leave their husband. Yuzhu also credits that some women might consider their forced marriage a better option to the life of poverty and hard labor they would be subject to upon returning home or the idea that some women may not feel they can find another husband, since they "have already been with one".

=== India ===
Bride buying is an old practice in many regions in India. Bride-purchasing is common in the states of India such as Haryana, Jharkhand, and Punjab. According to CNN-IBN, women are “bought, sold, trafficked, raped and married off without consent” across certain parts of India. Bride-purchases are usually outsourced from Bihar, Assam, and West Bengal. The price of the bride (locally known as paros in Jharkhand), if bought from the sellers, may cost between 4,000 and 30,000 Indian rupees, which is the equivalent of $88 to $660USD. The brides' parents are normally paid an average of 500 to 1,000 Indian rupees (around $11 to $22USD). The need to purchase a bride arises from the low female-to-male ratio. Such low ratio was caused by the preference to give birth to sons instead of daughters, and female foeticide. In 2006, according to BBC News, there were around 861 women for every 1,000 men in Haryana; and the national ratio in India as a whole was 927 women for every 1,000 men. Women are not only purchased as brides or wives, but also as farm workers or househelp. Most women become “sex-slaves” or forced laborers who are later resold to human traffickers to defray the cost.

According to Punjabi writer Kirpal Kazak, bride-selling began in Jharkhand after the arrival of the Rajputs. The tribe decorate the women for sale with ornaments. The practice of the sale of women as brides declined after the Green Revolution in India, the “spread of literacy”, and the improvement of the male-female ratio since 1911. The ratio, however, declined in 2001. The practice of bride-purchasing became confined to the poor sections of society such as farmers, Scheduled Castes, and tribes. In poverty-stricken families, only one son gets married due to poverty and to “avoid the division of landed property”.

=== Korea ===
Bride-buying in North Korea is most common due to the great poverty the country suffers and the citizens taking many risks to leave the country. Human traffickers take this as an opportunity to traffic desperate North Korean women across the country's borders to China not often to sell as slaves, but mainly as brides. Upon arrival and wedlock, the women are said to be forced into labor, or sexual and physical abuse by their Chinese husbands. Although, there are successful marriages, they hardly ever last because of the illegality of North Korean citizens crossing the border without authorization, despite the women having been in the country for many years neither they nor their offspring are granted citizenship. As a result, they are arrested and sent back to their homeland or kept in China to face the consequences of trespassing. Institutions around the world are requesting China to give refuge to the great number of people who fled North Korea seeking shelter, however the solicitation has not yet been approved of. In South Korea, bride-buying is not as common as it is in North Korea, though it still exists in varied ways. The majority of the brides bought in South Korea are from different parts of Asia, largely from the southeast side; in addition, bride-buying internationally in South Korea is claimed to be encouraged as a result of the declining population.

=== Vietnam ===
Bride-buying in Vietnam has progressed illicitly, becoming the most exploitative commercialized industry in recent history, especially around the northern mountain provinces bordering China. Virgin Vietnamese women, from 18 to 25 years old particularly, are targeted by several third parties known as the quickie matchmaking agencies for East and Southeast Asian men from South Korea, Taiwan, China, Malaysia and Singapore. Virginity is considered the most valuable trait in this business as virgin Vietnamese women are often purchased at a higher price. The price ranges differ among agencies; packages are valued between $5000 and $22,000USD which includes a wedding, a visa, a health examination test, and a language course. According to surveys conducted in Korea, 65% of the Vietnamese respondents only completed primary or lower secondary school. This lack of education can explain the poor social knowledge that allows this industry to grow. Vietnamese women prostitute themselves to foreigners. By selling sex for visas they are introduced to new duties which include labor and domestic servitude. The aforementioned quickie agencies usually group three to five men together to search for Vietnamese wives. This grouping of potential customers generates more profit, saving the organization approximately 50 to 60% in fees estimated to be around $85,000USD per trip.

== Bride-buying in Africa ==
One thing many individuals in Africa disagree on is bride-buying. In Africa, bride-buying tends to work out against women's best interest, causing many to feel a sense of gender inequality as well as a lack of progress in the women's rights sector. In East Africa, some marriages involve transfer of valuable properties that are delivered from the families of the groom and gifted to the families of the bride. Certain phrases like bride-pricing, dowry, bride-wealth, and some indigenous words: "lobolo", "mala", "bogadi", and "chiko" all make up different codes of bride purchases.

== Literature ==
Literature that delves into the selling women as brides includes titles such as Eho Hamara Jeevna by Punjabi novelist Dalip Kaur Tiwana, the play Ik Hor Ramayan by playwright Ajmer Singh Aulakh, Buying a Bride:An Engaging History of Mail-Order Matches by Marcia A. Zug, Object: Matrimony: The Risky Business Of Mail-Order Matchmaking On The Western Frontier by Chris Enss, the epic Vietnamese poem The Tale of Kieu by Nguyễn Du, the novel Tat Den by Ngo Tat To, and the novel Buying the Bride by Penny Wylder.

== See also ==
- Mail-order bride
- Picture bride
- Bride kidnapping
- Bride price
- Arranged marriage
- Arranged marriage in India
- Human trafficking in India
- Human trafficking in Vietnam
- Human trafficking in the People's Republic of China
- Wife selling
- Wife selling (English custom)
- The Bartered Bride
- Female foeticide in India
- Lobolo
