= Molkki =

2020 Indian television series

- Genre: Drama
- Created by: Ekta Kapoor
- Written by: Dheeraj Sarna
- Screenplay by: Saba Mumtaz; Shilpa Jathar; Sonali Jaffar
- Story by: Gajra Kottary; Advait Kottary
- Directed by: Muzammil Desai
- Creative director: Shivangi Babbar
- Starring: See below
- Opening theme: "Molkki" by Priya Dubey
- Composer: Vinod Ghimare
- Country of origin: India
- Original language: Hindi
- No. of seasons: 1
- No. of episodes: 322

Production
- Producers: Ekta Kapoor; Shobha Kapoor
- Editors: Vikash Sharma; Vishal Sharma
- Camera setup: Multi-camera
- Running time: 22–24 minutes
- Production company: Balaji Telefilms

Original release
- Network: Colors TV
- Release: 16 November 2020 – 11 February 2022

Related
- Molkki – Rishton Ki Agnipariksha

Molkki (lit. 'One Who Has a Price') is an Indian Hindi-language television drama series produced by Ekta Kapoor for Balaji Telefilms. The series was broadcast on Colors TV from 16 November 2020 to 11 February 2022. It starred Priyal Mahajan and Amar Upadhyay.

== Background ==
The series, set in Haryana's Rewari district, focuses on molkki pratha (the custom of bride-buying in India). Its plot revolves around Purvi, a 19-year-old girl who becomes the molkki bride of 42-year-old chief Virendra Pratapsingh, a widower and the father of two. She fights for herself and the rights of other molkki brides while fulfilling her responsibilities as a chieftain's wife, a daughter-in-law, and a mother.

== Plot ==
Purvi marries Virendra, a widowed father of two and head of a village in Haryana's Rewari district. The relationship between Purvi and his children improves, and she tries to bring them closer to their father. While the family is on a picnic, Vaibhav (Virendra's half-brother) rapes Priyashi (Purvi's sister); Anjali (Purvi and Virendra's sister-in-law) records the event.

Virendra initially refuses to believe Purvi's allegations about his brother. He asks Priyashi to choose the punishment, but she marries Vaibhav. Virendra arranges the marriage, despite Anjali's plotting to prevent it. Vaibhav wants to take revenge on his brother, and hires a hitman to shoot him. Purvi saves Virendra, but he is attacked by goons hired by Vaibhav. Priyashi learns about Vaibhav's intentions on their honeymoon, and tells Purvi; the hitmen are caught. Purvi enrolls in a nearby college, where she must downplay her wealth. Vaibhav decides to punish Priyashi for her betrayal, and apparently kills her. Purvi suspects that Vaibhav planned to hurt her sister. Vaibhav provokes Virendra to shoot him, hoping that he will be imprisoned. Wearing a bulletproof jacket, Vaibhav escapes and tries to leave the country with Anjali's help. Purvi uncovers her brother-in-law's scheme, and frees her husband from prison. Priyashi, still alive, says that she planned to have Vaibhav accused of her murder. She shoots him, and vows to wreak havoc in Purvi's life. Priyashi and Anjali unsuccessfully try to separate Purvi and Virendra. Purvi awakens from a nightmare about a woman in chains: Virendra's first wife, Sakshi, presumed dead five years earlier. In a flashback, Virendra and his family travel to Goa for his marriage to Purvi; Prakashi plots to ruin their wedding day. As Purvi and Virendra take their vows, Juhi and Manas (Sakshi's children) see her. Purvi is devastated; the wedding is cancelled, and she poses as a helper in Virendra's house. Virendra tells Sakshi how he married Purvi. Purvi prepares to leave, but Sakshi asks her to stay and thanks her for looking after the family. While Virendra is away, however, Sakshi humiliates Purvi. Confronted by Virendra, Sakshi demands to know his feelings for Purvi and cuts her wrists. Purvi demands a divorce.

Sakshi persuades Purvi to marry Vipul so Virendra gets over her; Vipul agrees. As Purvi's Haldi begins, Virendra wins the first chance to apply turmeric to her; however, her father refuses to bless the marriage. Purvi expresses her love for Vipul as he supports her, but Virendra keeps Purvi from applying turmeric to Vipul. Virendra, drunk, confronts her and Vipul; he has an accident, and falls unconscious. After seeing him unconscious, Purvi knows she loves him. On the wedding day, Virendra learns that the divorce is delayed; he rushes to the venue, and carries Purvi away. Sakshi reveals that she bribed Prakashi and Anjali to throw Purvi out of the house. Purvi has an accident, and loses her memory.

Six months later, Purvi lives with Daksh and his family; Daksh wants to marry her. Virendra, Daksh's business partner, thinks Purvi is dead. In Delhi, he hears Purvi's voice on Daksh's phone and wants to see her. Purvi, arranging her marriage to Daksh, says she does not recognise Virendra and faints. Virendra learns that Purvi had been hit by Daksh's car and lost her memory; she is now known as Dhwani, and her doctor says that forcing her to remember her past might kill her. Virendra, undaunted, persuades Daksh and Dhwani to return to Rewari for the wedding. Anjali and Prakashi lie about Virendra, and Daksh returns to Delhi. Priyashi plays Purvi and Virendra's wedding video, and Purvi regains her memory. Daksh tries to rape her, but Virendra shoots him dead and is arrested. Arjun, a lawyer, gets Virendra acquitted and Purvi agrees to remarry him. He kidnaps Juhi and Manas and demands a ₹10 crore ransom. Sakshi decides to have another child to reenter Virendra's life and get rid of Purvi, who decides to become the surrogate mother of their child. She becomes pregnant, and is kidnapped and tortured by Arjun and Sakshi. Sakshi forces Virendra to agree to marry her to save Purvi, who stops it. Sakshi pushes Purvi down stairs, causing a miscarriage.

== Cast ==
=== Main ===
- Amar Upadhyay as Virendra Pratapsingh: Bade Mukhiiya Ji's son from first marriage; Prakashi's step-son; Yogendra and Vaibhav's brother; Sakshi and Purvi's husband; Nandini, Veer, Juhi and Manas's father (2020–2022)
- Priyal Mahajan as Purvi Pratapsingh: Daddu and Priyashi's daughter; Veerendra's second wife; Nandini, Veer, Juhi and Manas's step-mother (2020–2022)
- Toral Rasputra as Sakshi Pratapsingh: Manikant and Priyamvada's daughter; Veerendra's first wife; Nandini, Veer, Juhi and Manas's mother (2021)

=== Recurring ===
- Supriya Shukla as Prakashi Devi Pratapsingh: Matriarch of Singh family; Bheem's sister; Bade Mukhiya Ji's second wife; Veerendra, Yogendra and Vaibhav's step-mother; Nandini, Veer, Juhi and Manas's step-grandmother (2020–2022)
- Tushar Kawale as Yogendra "Yogi" Pratapsingh: Bade Mukhiya Ji's second son from first marriage; Prakashi's step-son; Veerendra and Vaibhav's brother; Nandini, Veer, Juhi and Manas's uncle; Anjali's husband (2020–2022)
- Pranav Kumar as Vaibhav Pratapsingh: Bade Mukhiya Ji's third son from first marriage; Prakashi's step-son; Veerendra and Yogendra's brother; Nandini, Veer, Juhi and Manas's uncle (2020–2021)
- Rishika Nag as Nandini Pratapsingh: Virendra and Sakshi's daughter; Purvi's step-daughter; Veer, Juhi and Manas's sister (2021)
- Mohit Hiranandani as Veer Pratapsingh: Virendra and Sakshi's son; Purvi's step-son; Nandini, Juhi and Manas's brother (2021)
- Anushka Sharma as Juhi Pratapsingh: Virendra and Sakshi's daughter; Purvi's step-daughter; Nandini, Veer and Manas's sister (2020–2022)
- Rithvik Gupta as Manas Pratapsingh: Virendra and Sakshi's son; Purvi's step-son; Nandini, Veer and Juhi's brother (2020–2022)
- Abhay Bhargava as Bheem Singh: Prakashi's brother; Veerendra's step-uncle (2020–2022)
- Shraddha Jaiswal as Anjali Yogendra Pratap Singh: Yogendra's wife (2020–2022)
- Trilokchander Singh as Sarpanch (2020–2021)
- Madhuri Pandey as Chandni Singh Shekhawat (2021)
- Meenakshi Sethi as Nani (2021)
- Akshay Jawrani as Karan (2021)
- Ved Bharadwaj as Mahesh (2020–2022)
- Meena Mir as Savita (2020–2022)
- Dhwani Gori as Priyashi Aarav Choudhary: Purvi and Duddu's sister; Veer's ex-girlfriend; Aarav's wife (2020–2022)
- Kajal Chauhan as Sudha Veer Pratap Singh: Veer's wife (2020–2021)
- Vyon Mehta as Duddu (2020–2022)
- Neha Jurel as Jyoti (2020–2022)
- Sanjay Swaraj as Kanji Bhai (2020)
- Lankesh Bhardwaj as Inspector (2020–2021)
- Nikhil Narang as Vipul Sharma Kumar / Purvi Husband(2020–2021)
- Manorama Bhattishyam as Bhuri (2020–2022)
- Manish Khanna as Charan Singh Chaudhary (2021–2022)
- Abhishek Singh Pathania as Aarav Singh Chaudhary (2021)
- Shivam Khajuria as Naveen (2020)
- Unknown as Vikas (2021)
- Priyanka Zemse as Aarati (2021)
- Trupti Mishra as Radhika (2021)
- Ankit Gera as Daksh Singh Shekhawat: Purvi's obsessive lover (2021) (Dead)
- Aakash Talwar as Arjun Bajwa: Purvi Husband (2021)
- Shantanu Monga as Satyam / Thakur Gajraj Singh (2021) / (2022)
- Meenakshi Chugh as Heera Bai (2021–2022)

== Guest appearances ==
- Avinesh Rekhi as Sarabjeet Gill from Choti Sarrdaarni (2021)
- Anchal Sahu as Parineet Kakkar from Parineetii (2022)

== Production ==
Molkki began filming in October 2020. The series addresses bride buying in Haryana:

My character explores the harsh realities of the real world. I hope people connect with it and bring in change for the betterment of society. The main reason why I have picked up this character is that it challenges my set of skills as an actor, as there are no similarities between our lives. I was born and brought up in Delhi hence the word Molkki was alien to me. Going through the whole research and hearing the unheard sounds of life it's already been a beautiful experience in its own way. Yes, being an uptown girl playing a character that was born and brought up in rural areas requires a lot of research, study, and understanding of the way of their culture.

— Priyal Mahajan

== Reception ==
According to ThePrint, Molkki tackled the issue of brides for sale when Purvi is forced into marriage to a sarpanch twice her age for money. The series was "as real as it gets ... the serial is set in Haryana and Uttar Pradesh where such marriage transactions are only too often the tragedy".

== Influence ==
On 15 June 2021, residents of a small village in Rajasthan banned molkki pratha after watching Molkki. Amar Upadhyay, who played Virendra, was proud of the series' influence.

== Sequel ==
A sequel, Molkki - Rishton Ki Agnipariksha, premiered on Colors TV on 13 February 2023. It starred Ashish Kapoor and Vidhi Yadav, in Yadav's TV debut. The sequel had low ratings, and ended within a month.
