= Eziorsu =

Community in southeastern Nigeria

Eziorsu is an autonomous community on the South bank of the Oguta Lake, southeastern Nigeria. Its one of the foremost territories that witnessed western or European expedition during colonization and used as a gateway by the British to advance the Igboland further. As at the 1991 census in Nigeria, the population of Eziorsu was estimated at 14,560. It is one of the Oil and Gas producing communities in Imo State, being the second largest producing community in Oguta L.G.A after Izombe. The community promised to continue to protect and support Addax Petroleum at all times, especially as the Company remained the best partner to the communities in terms of best practices in corporate social responsibility.

Located in the equatorial rainforest region, it is enormous importance to the state, being major stable food producers in the state, producing yam, cassava, maize, palm oil etc.

== History ==
Some of the communities in the Oguta area such as Orsu (known as Orsu Ogbahu, Orsu Oko, or Eziorsu) traced their migration from Ancient kingdom of Benin. That was about the early 16th century. The migration became very inevitable following the series of inter and intra communal wars in which the Benin kingdom engaged in to enlarge their dynasty and for the purpose of wielding greater economic And political power. Furthermore, the ironhanded reign of Oba Ewuare the Great and his successor, Oba Esigie, precipitated the move, which affected many other communities including Onicha (Onitsha), Ado, Ogbaru, Ase, Ogba, epkeye to mention but a few.

Evidence of this migration from Benin can be traced to the fact of many words in Eziorsu pronounced and having same meaning or responsibility are still being used as integral words of Eziorsu language and tradition. Moreover some traditional titles and common names similar in meaning and pronunciation in Benin, Onitsha, Ogbaru and others still exist, e.g. Iyasara, Ajie, Ogene, Umudei, Oba etc.

There are ten distinct villages in Eziorsu, arising from the seven sons of Orsu and others that divided amongst these seven sons:

- Igbugankwo
- Akpu (Ezeji)
- Dei ( Enyiora{Aranze and Ndanike} and Ezeocha), Enyiora and Ezeocha being the sons of Dei, this village now has three villages, namely Ezeocha Dei, Aranze Dei and Ndanike Dei.
- Darakerekpo ( Iyasara and Ngbaa) Two villages
- Mboge
- Obuike

== Tradition ==
Eziorsu autonomous community has distinct tradition as could be seen in the following.

=== Marriage ===
1. First Official visit (Ibu Nmayi nzunzu)
2. Ije mara uzo
3. Ibu nmayi Nne na Nna
4. Ibu nmayi obi ukwu

Marriage payments

1. Aku ishi nwanya
2. Ego nde okei
3. Ego Umu Ada
4. Ego Umuokorobia na Umu agbo

Brides parents responsibility

1. Nri oyinwanya
2. Ihu onu aku
3. Idu nwanyi

=== Festivals ===
New Yam Festival (Ogene)

1. Ogene nkirika
2. Ogene oma
3. Owu (Okoroshi) Festival: This festival marks the beginning of planting season and the end of harvest season, using Yam as the major crop of significance.

== Eziorsu political system ==
Eziorsu has a hierarchical or pyramidal socio-cultural system in which the king is the apex of the polity and is selected from the maximal lineage of UMUDEI-EBO-ITO, comprising Umudanike, Umuaranze and Umuezeocha villages. Kingship rotates among the aforementioned lineages. In other words, Eziorsu autonomous community is a centralized state with an ancient political set up. It is not an acephalous socio-political system, where authority is not confined to a particular head rather a group of people with recognized right and obligations.

As a centralized political organization, authority is concentrated on a single head and this arrangement is likened to a "Presidential Monarchy", found in those communities who came in touch with Nri people

=== The act of identifying and selecting the Eze Igwe of Eziorsu ===
Whenever the kingship stool of the community becomes vacant, owing to death, deposition or other inevitable causes, the maximal lineage of Umudei-ebo-ito comprising Umundanike, Umuaranze and Umuezeocha will normally assemble in order to make arrangements for the filling of the vacancy. This is done because the rotation of kingship among them is a hereditary possession.

Depending on the lineage or village of reference, an ORACLE is consulted so as to identify a candidate whose reign will bring about a longer life span, peace and prosperity to the community and the would-be king in particular. The person named by the oracle will be consulted for necessary preparations.

==== The Ikwe Omu ceremony ====
This is the preliminary investigation, involving the reckoning of the descent or genealogy of the would-be king. The ceremony take place at the house of the traditional Prime Minister, the Iyasara (Nnowu or Onowu) from Umudarakerekpo village.

During this colourful ceremony, all the representatives of the lineages/villages in the community must form a panel, with the objective of tracing the patrilateral filiation with matrilateral complementary filiation of the candidate, his would-be Odabu (first wife of the king) and Alashi (second wife of the king). if there is no social stigma attached to their descent, then the candidate qualifies to be installed as a king. Moreover, the would-be king must be free from any physical deformity. As soon as the necessary and sufficient conditions are fulfilled by the candidate, his installation becomes approved by the community's representatives and the king makers. A date is therefore fixed by the king makers (Umuiyasara).

==== The installation ceremony ====
The coronation or installation of the Eze Igwe is usually held at the residence of the proposed Eze Igwe's mother. In the mid night prior to the installation, the Eze Igwe designate is expected to leave his decorated palace with his palace chiefs or oririnzere for his mother's family.

At the ceremony, the would-be king will be seated on the ground, where he will be subjected to ridicule and humiliation, and finally honoured by being crowned by the king makers (Umuiyasara). The King s decorated with his traditional regalia including his long red cap known as "AGALAGA". After the ceremony, the king is carried shoulder high to his palace where he will be seated on the throne by the king makers and the Umudei-Ebo-Ito people. This is followed by jubilation, merriment and refreshment.

=== The king makers ===
The king makers come from Umuiyasara kindred of Umudarakerepko village of the community. They are also referred to as the producer of the IYASARA (Prime Minister) of the kingdom. The installation or coronation of Eze Igwe (King) of Eziorsu is the prerogative of the king makers. The Iyasara (also called Onowu) is the next in command after the Eze Igwe and he wields a lot of influence in the king's cabinet.

=== The king's cabinet ===
The king has a body guard known as "OGBU-NGWA-NGWA". The members of the king's cabinet are recruited from the various lineages of the town or community. These members of the cabinet are regarded as the palace chiefs and they have different designations depending upon the kindred or village.

In addition to the palace chiefs is the palace Secretary which is the prerogative of the Eze Igwe to appoint. These palace chiefs and their titles (and villages) are shown below: Iyasara/Onowu (Umudara), Okike Yiri Eze (Umuoreke in Umuakpu), Omodi (Umudara), Omodi ( Umuokoroakpacha in Umuakpu), Okita (Umumgbaa, now merged with Umudara), Ogene (Umuobike), Oshimiri ( Umumbogori), Ogana (Umuigbugankwo), Omodi Eze (Umuakpu), and Isoma (Umuigbugankwo).

The members of the king's cabinet traditionally are referred to as Ndi-Ichie and help the king in the running of the community by offering useful suggestions.

=== The council of elders ===
This is made up of the king's members of the cabinet, the elders of the community and all titled men (Ndi Nze). For important matters such as the promulgation of new laws, the decision to conduct or wage wars, the fixing of dates of important festivals, etc. the council of elders is summoned without delay.

=== A schedule of Eziorsu kings ===
The kingship as earlier mentioned rotates among the maximal lineage of Umudei-ebo-ito comprising Umundaike, Umuaranze and Umuezeocha villages. Below is the list of past and present kings (Eze Igwes) of Eziorsu autonomous community in chronological order.

1. Nnanyi Eze Oji (Igwe I)
2. Nnayi Eze Okanma (Igwe II)
3. Nnayi Eze Elekweonani (Igwe III) of umuaranze (Dei) village
4. Nnanyi Eze Anyeji (Igwe IV) of Umuaranze (Dei) village
5. Nnanyi Eze Ujoadinigwe (Igwe V) of Umundanike (Dei) village
6. Nnayi Eze Atokwu (Igwe VI) of Umundanike (Dei) village
7. Nnanyi Eze Ogubie (Igwe VII)
8. Nnanyi Eze Adigwe (Igwe VIII)
9. Nnayi Eze Ojigbani (Igwe IX)
10. Nnayi Eze Omebuka (Igwe X) of Umuezeocha (Dei) village
11. Nnayi Eze Ahiri (Igwe XI)
12. Nnayi Eze Oduah (Igwe XII)
13. Nnayi Eze Atie (Igwe XIII)
14. Nnayi Eze Ikwekiri (Igwe XIV)
15. Nnayi Eze Adiemea (Igwe XV)
16. Nnayi Eze Okwunejeni (Igwe XVI)
17. Nnayi Eze Ifi (Igwe XVII)
18. Nnayi Eze Okara (Igwe XVIII) of Umundanike (Dei) village
19. Nnayi Eze Ukado (Igwe XIX) of Umuaranze (Dei) village
20. Nnayi Eze Victor N. IJEOMA (Igwe XX) of Umundanike (Dei) village – Incumbent Eze Igwe, installed 24 August 2012.

== Eziorsu annual summit ==
The first ever summit tagged "Eziorsu Maiden Summit 2017" was held in the community on 28 December 2017 under the distinguished chairmanship of Sir Clifford Udeogwu.

The summit theme was “Eziorsu in Transition: Seeking a Roadmap for Peace and Sustainable Development” with an exposѐ done by Barr. Stephen Ifeanyichukwu Abiaziem (SP). Other sub-themes highlighted with their presenters were: 1) Discovering our identity, our values, and attitudes – Hon. Sir Godwin Amugo 2) Leadership: Eziorsu in focus – Hon. Ngwuruakor A.C. 3) The Girl-child in today's world – Mrs. Chioma Aninwe

The summit participants discussed, brainstormed, x-rayed and highlighted some salient points relating to but not limited to the origin and rich cultural heritage of Eziorsu people, the leadership failure and its attendant consequences on sustainable development, the imperatives of the education of the girl child in Eziorsu of today, among other sundry issues.

This summit has been fixed to be an annual ritual or event to re-assess the progress and development of the community. This year's (2018) summit has a theme tagged" EZIORSU IN TRANSITION- A Clarion Call to Rebuild and Redefine Our Community and Heritage" with the planning committee to be chaired by Engr. Adindu C. Iyasara. The papers as presented in the maiden summit (Eziorsu Maiden Summit 2017) are shown below.
