= Exchange of women =

The exchange of women is an element of alliance theory — the structuralist theory of Claude Lévi-Strauss and other anthropologists who see society as based upon the patriarchal treatment of women as property, being given to other men to cement alliances. Such formal exchange may be seen in the ceremony of the traditional Christian wedding, in which the bride is given to the groom by her father.

== Kinship ==
The structuralist view of kinship was laid out in Lévi-Strauss' grand statement: Les Structures élémentaires de la parenté (The Elementary Structures of Kinship). In this, he combined Mauss' ideas about the importance of gifts in primitive societies with the role of the incest taboo in forcing exchanges of mates outside of closely related family groups. The resulting exchange of women is asymmetric in that men have power over women which is not reciprocated. The resulting social structures provide a framework for treating the oppression of women as a social construct rather than being a matter of biology.

In "The Traffic in Women," Gayle Rubin articulated a feminist analysis of kinship, gender roles, sexuality, the incest taboo and taboo against homosexuality, as part of a historically evolving "sex/gender system."

== Biblical patriarchy ==
Men in ancient Hebrew culture established and negotiated their relations with other men through the exchange of female relatives. This is seen in Old Testament narratives such as the stories spread across the books of Joshua, Judges, Samuel and Kings.

== Criminal treatment ==
In Afghanistan and remote areas of Pakistan, women may be exchanged in compensation for a debt or offence such as murder. This practice is known as swara. Pakistan's constitution prohibits this with a penalty of 3 to 10 years of imprisonment but the custom still persists.

== In art ==
The exchange of women in the course of male bonding appears as a theme in the novels The Great Gatsby and Tropic of Capricorn. Indecent Proposal and other female-barter movies were criticized for promoting this theme.

== See also ==
- Arranged marriage
- Bride kidnapping
- Forced marriage
- Hostage
- Mail-order bride
- Marriage of convenience
- Placement marriage
- Raptio
- Sister exchange, form of exchange of women
- Secrecy
- Watta satta, exchange matters in Indian subcontinent
- Wife selling
