= Fortunate number =

Integer named after Reo Fortune

Unsolved problem in mathematics
Are any Fortunate numbers composite? (Fortune's conjecture)
More unsolved problems in mathematics

In number theory, a Fortunate number is the smallest integer $m > 1$ such that, for a given positive integer $n$, $p_n\#+m$ is a prime number, where the primorial $p_n\#$ is the product of the first $n$ prime numbers. They are named after Reo Fortune.

For example, to find the seventh Fortunate number, one would first calculate the product of the first seven primes, which is

$$2\cdot 3\cdot 5\cdot 7\cdot 11\cdot 13\cdot 17 = 510510.$$

Adding 2 to that gives another even number, while adding 3 would give another multiple of 3. One would similarly rule out the integers up to 18. Adding 19, however, gives 510529, which is prime. Hence 19 is a Fortunate number.

The Fortunate numbers for the first primorials are:

$$3, 5, 7, 13, 23, 17, 19, 23, 37, 61, 67, 61, 71, 47, 107, 59, 61, 109, 89, 103, 79, 151, 197,\dots$$

(sequence A005235 in the OEIS). The Fortunate numbers sorted in numerical order with duplicates removed are

$$3, 5, 7, 13, 17, 19, 23, 37, 47, 59, 61, 67, 71, 79, 89, 101, 103, 107, 109, 127, 151, 157, 163, 167, 191, 197, \dots$$

(sequence A046066 in the OEIS).

Fortune conjectured that no Fortunate number is composite. A Fortunate prime is a Fortunate number which is also a prime number. As of 2017, all known Fortunate numbers are prime, checked up to $n=3000$.

The Fortunate number for $p_n\#$ is always above $p_n$ and all its divisors are larger than $p_n$. This is because $p_n\#+m$ is divisible by the prime factors of $m$ not larger than $p_n$. It follows that if a composite Fortunate number does exist, it must be greater than or equal to $p_{n+1}^2$.

Paul Carpenter defines the less Fortunate numbers as the differences between $p_n\#$ and the largest prime less than $p_n\# - 1$. These are also conjectured to be always prime.
