= Reo Fortune =

Anthropologist

Reo Fortune

Reo Franklin Fortune (27 March 1903 – 25 November 1979) was a New Zealand-born social anthropologist. Originally trained as a psychologist, Fortune was a student of some of the major theorists of British and American social anthropology including Alfred Cort Haddon, Bronislaw Malinowski and Alfred Radcliffe-Brown. He lived an international life, holding various academic and government positions: in China, at Lingnan University from 1937 to 1939; in Toledo, Ohio, USA from 1940 to 1941; at the University of Toronto, from 1941 to 1943; in Burma, as government anthropologist, from 1946 to 1947; and finally, at Cambridge University in the United Kingdom from 1947 to 1971, as lecturer in social anthropology specialising in Melanesian language and culture.

He was first married to Margaret Mead in 1928, with whom he undertook field studies in New Guinea from 1931 to 1933. They divorced in 1935. Fortune subsequently married Eileen Pope, also a New Zealander, in 1937.

Fortune provided significant insights into the consequences of matrilateral and patrilateral cross-cousin marriage in advance of work by Claude Levi-Strauss. He is also known for his contribution to mathematics with his study of Fortunate numbers in number theory.

The 2014 novel Euphoria by Lily King is a fictionalized account of the relationships between Fortune, Mead and Gregory Bateson in pre-WWII New Guinea.

== Selected publications ==
- 1927, The Mind in Sleep. Kegan Paul.
- 1932, Sorcerers of Dobu. Routledge.
- 1932, Omaha Secret Societies. Columbia University Press.
- 1933, A note on some forms of kinship structure. Oceania, 4(1), 1–9.
- 1935, Manus Religion, An ethnological study of the Manus natives of the Admiralty Islands. American Philosophical Press.
- 1942, Arapesh. American Ethnological Society Publication 19; 237 pages.

== Photographs ==
Many of the easily accessible images of Fortune include his one-time wife Margaret Mead, who was known for her interest in photography as an ethnographic method.

The National Library of New Zealand (Māori: Te Puna Matauranga o Aotearoa) holds a large collection of family and fieldwork photos of Reo and Eileen Fortune's lives in China, North America, and England.

In 1959 and again in 1970–71, Fortune revisited Dobu, the island community he made famous in his 1932 book, The Sorcerers of Dobu.
