= Placement marriage =

Arranged marriage in Mormon fundamentalist groups

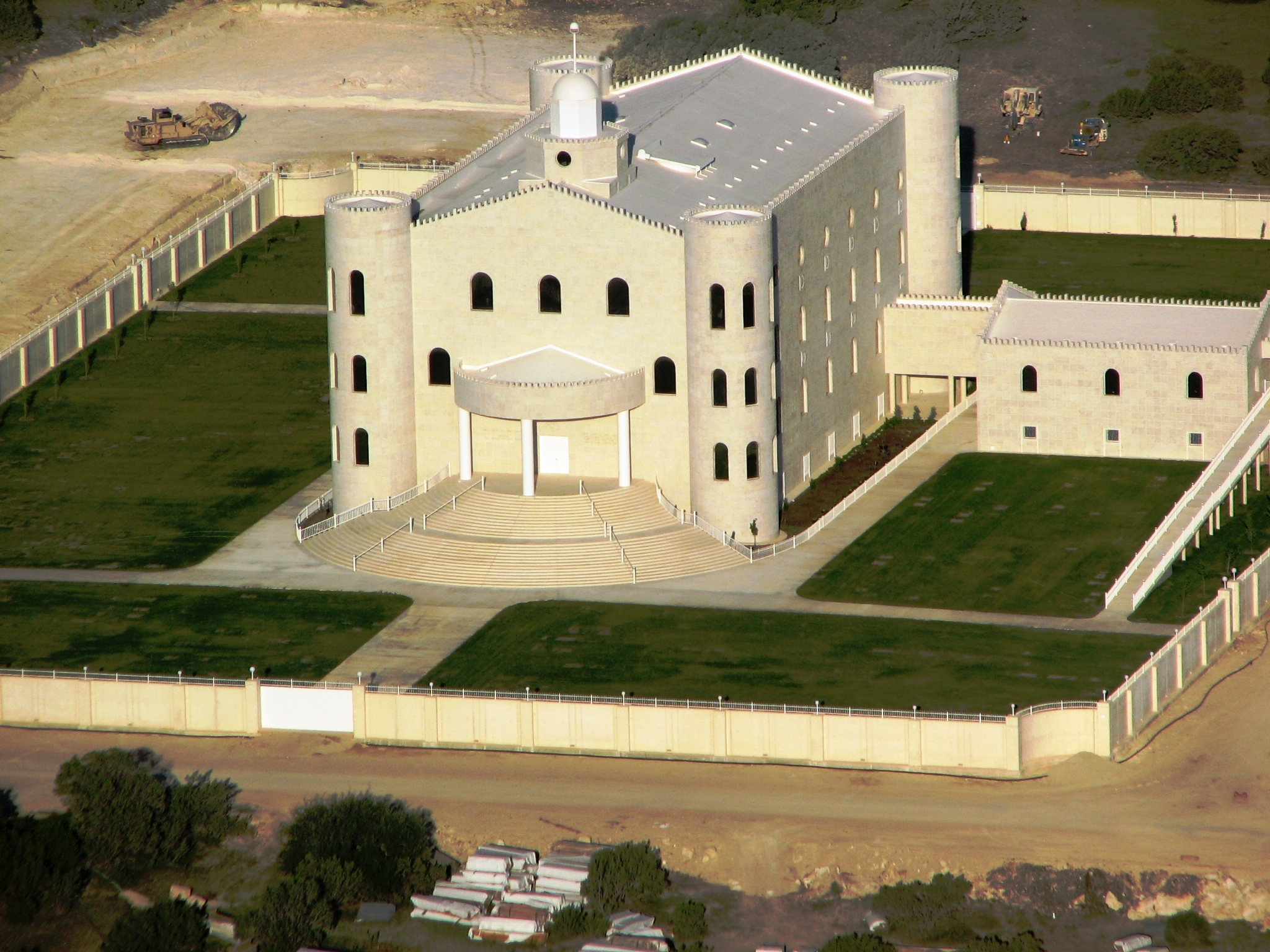
Eldorado, Texas FLDS Temple

The term placement marriage (also known as the law of placing) refers to arranged marriages between members of the Fundamentalist Church of Jesus Christ of Latter-Day Saints (FLDS Church). Placement marriage is believed and practiced by members of the FLDS Church to show their commitment and obedience in order to obtain salvation for themselves and their parents; it might be considered “the most visible outward symbol of members’ devotion."

== Origin ==
The Fundamentalist Latter Day Saint group is one of eight primary Fundamentalist Mormon groups; other well-known groups include the Apostolic United Brethren, Latter Day Church of Christ (also known as the "Kingston group"), Righteous Branch of the Church of Jesus Christ of Latter-day Saints, True and Living Church of Jesus Christ of Saints of the Last Days, and the Centennial Park group (also known as "The Work of Jesus Christ" or just "The Work"). Placement marriage is a practice that uniquely belongs to the FLDS Church, although there may be some similarities between the beliefs in marriage practices with the Latter Day Church of Christ.

The idea of placement marriage within the FLDS Church did not exist prior to the 1940s. The group which eventually became known as the FLDS changed the concepts of courtship and marriage for their followers over the past fifty years. Before that most, if not all, fundamentalist Mormons chose marriage partners according to patterns which mirrored those of the Church of Jesus Christ of Latter-day Saints (LDS Church) in the nineteenth century, in that their decisions for marriage were made by considering "varied combinations of personal attraction and principles of faith (which usually included testimony or personal revelation) along with direct or indirect influence of family and ecclesiastical leaders”. This latter method of freely choosing marriage partners is still predominately used by most Mormon fundamentalists who believe in or practice plural marriage. Most fundamentalist Mormons, apart from the FLDS, do not practice arranged marriages. Rather, they believe that arranged marriages violate the members’ "free agency". Most fundamentalist Mormons today are not and never were members of the LDS Church, because that church renounced polygamy in 1890 and excommunicated any of its members who were found to be practicing "plural marriage" (i.e. polygamy). Most fundamentalist Mormons today are descendants of those who were excommunicated from the LDS Church for entering into polygamous marriages.

== During the fundamentalist split (early 1950s) ==
Changes in the way marriage partners were selected was one of the major issues that ultimately led to divisions of the fundamentalists Mormon community in the early 1950s. Some leaders encouraged younger girls and women to marry without their parents' knowledge or consent if their parents were considered "out of harmony" with priesthood leaders; such girls and women were instead encouraged to be placed in a marriage under the direction of priesthood leaders. Placement marriage became the common practice in Short Creek during the presidency of Leroy Johnson. This was primarily due to a belief that obedience to priesthood was necessary for salvation, that the Priesthood Council leaders were the ones entitled to revelation regarding marriage—especially plural marriage, and the fact that the members believed that placement marriage was a more divine observance than when they chose their own spouse. Members generally respected the right of the Priesthood Council to assign marriages. Parents' consent for their children to marry in plural marriage was considered relevant when they were "in harmony" with the Priesthood Council.

== During the late 1980s and early 1990s ==
=== Changes in authority ===
Before Leroy Johnson died, he dismissed two of the remaining three members of the Priesthood Council, leaving only himself and Rulon Jeffs. After Johnson's death, Jeffs was the only remaining Priesthood Council member. He assumed leadership over the group and asserted his position that a priesthood council was no longer needed and that he alone held priesthood authority to rule. In 1991 Jeffs legally incorporated the group as the Fundamentalist Church of Jesus Christ of Latter-Day Saints. Marianne T. Watson, in her article "The 1948 Secret Marriage of Louis J. Barlow: Origins of FLDS Placement Marriage," stated that this fundamentalist group “whole-heartedly sustained the arranged-marriage system" and that "After the death of Leroy Johnson, they advocated complete obedience to Rulon Jeffs, considering him to be the prophet, the Keyholder, and the mouth piece of God”.

==== The first wife ====
Under the placement marriage system, young members of the FLDS Church are not allowed to court or date before marriage and are discouraged to fall in love until after they are married. They are permitted to become acquainted with one another through the community, church, school, or family ties, but they are not allowed to be more than just friends with anyone until the Priesthood Council arranges a spouse for them.

When a young man, generally around the age of twenty-one, feels ready to be married he approaches the Priesthood Council and then they decide who he will marry. They select a wife for the young man through a process of inspiration and revelation. When a woman feels prepared to be married, around the ages of 16 to 25, she informs her father of her own readiness, and is taken to meet with the prophet to tell him that she is ready to be married. While most women are approved, some are asked to wait for a time. If the prophet agrees to place her, then the future spouse is notified, and a ceremony is performed generally within the week and sometimes immediately. A woman's opinions relative to the selection of her husband are sometimes considered but not always, and she can decide against marrying a man who is selected for her, although this does not happen very frequently.

==== Plural marriage ====
The ages of a man's plural wives can vary greatly, although the first wife is generally close to the husband’s age.

The process for entering a plural marriage is slightly different. Married men do not normally volunteer themselves to enter plural marriage, but wait to be asked by the Priesthood Council. Delaying is allowed but declining is generally frowned upon. If a man does decline he's considered unfaithful for rejecting the decision made for him by the Priesthood. All of the choices about when, where, and whom he will marry are generally decisions made by the priesthood leaders.

==== Success of marriages ====
Within this group, the idea of not knowing their spouse until minutes before they are married is usually viewed as romantic. The couple is expected to learn to love one another, even if affection isn’t instantaneous. Several couples are grateful for this practice because they believe “the only sure revelation comes from the prophet; they were glad to have a prophet to tell them whom to marry.”

The priesthood leader of the Colorado City (FLDS) group chooses to arrange marriages because it reassures the members of the stability and permanence that is promised in a placement marriage. They also choose this approach so that the couples are not closely related in the isolated community. Some members have confessed that some of the marriages were less successful and a few failed completely.

== During Warren Jeffs's Presidency ==
There were suspicions that Warren Jeffs may have done away with the voluntary aspect of young women coming to him to say they were ready to be married. Underage marriage and marriages between close relatives became common in the FLDS Church. Arranged marriages of young girls to much older men, whom they may not even have known, were not unusual. It was also common for these men to be relatives who already had wives. One writer believes incest was permitted and considered doctrine in a large number of groups.

=== Wives of excommunicated men ===
In October 2002 the FLDS announced Warren Jeffs as the new president of the FLDS Church. Under Warren Jeffs's leadership, many male members were excommunicated. The wives, along with children and sometimes property, of these men were reassigned to other "more faithful" men. Some wives were reassigned more than once. If the wives did not agree to do as Jeffs instructed, they were also told to leave. Andrea Moore-Emmett, author of God's Brothel wrote this about placement marriages: “Whether a woman is already married or not, “releasings” (divorces) and “sealings” (marriages) from one man to another man are at the whim of the leader”.

=== Moving away from Colorado City/Hildale ===
Within a year of becoming president, Warren Jeffs began to send small numbers of members to other places outside of Colorado City and Hildale–such as the site in Texas.

=== Legal conflicts ===
==== Incest and child marriages ====
Instances such as this can lead to problems with the law. One man in a small group of Mormon fundamentalists called the Latter Day Church of Christ, founded by Charles W. Kingston, was recently "convicted of incest with teenage wives amid allegations of forced marriages and child abuse". Child marriages in the past have been common in certain areas. In the one community, young girls were marrying as young as 14 years old.

==== Kidnapping ====
During the 1944 raid some members were charged with kidnapping and violations of the Mann Act in connection with taking under-age plural wives across state lines. Fifteen men were prosecuted for unlawful cohabitation with their plural wives and were then sentenced to serve time in the Utah State Prison; nine more were sentenced to federal prison time. Charles Zitting and David Darger were charged with both federal and state sentences.

=== Free agency ===
The idea of free agency is a fundamental principle of the original LDS church, and is also considered an important part of Mormon Fundamentalist doctrine. But Martha Sontag Bradley, author of Women of Fundamentalism, points out, “Women in Short Creek had few choices to make as adults. Here the culture of fundamentalism collaborated with the limited opportunities offered in this isolated, rural frontier community.”

A few days after the 1953 Short Creek raid, Louis J. Barlow addressed placement marriages: "There have been no forced marriages. Everyone is free to leave or stay as he chooses".

Their choices are limited because they become so dependent on their leaders. The United Effort Plan, along with their isolation contributes to their inability to leave their church, and therefore, they are unable to make decisions except those that are commanded of them by their leaders such as placement marriage.

== See also ==
- Exchange of women
- Moral agency
- Endogamy
- Arranged marriage
- Forced marriage
