= Alliance theory =

Structuralist method of studying kinship

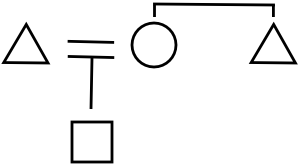
Kinship atome in alliance theory, empty background, bold line, for kinship use.

Alliance theory, also known as the general theory of exchanges, is a structuralist method of studying kinship relations. It finds its origins in Claude Lévi-Strauss's Elementary Structures of Kinship (1949) and is in opposition to the functionalist theory of Radcliffe-Brown. Alliance theory has oriented most anthropological French works until the 1980s; its influences were felt in various fields, including psychoanalysis, philosophy and political philosophy.

The hypothesis of a "marriage-alliance" emerged in this frame, pointing out towards the necessary interdependence of various families and lineages. Marriages themselves are thus seen as a form of communication that anthropologists such as Lévi-Strauss, Louis Dumont or Rodney Needham have described. Alliance theory hence tries to understand the basic questions about inter-individual relations, or what constitutes society.

Alliance theory is based on the incest taboo: according to it, only this universal prohibition of incest pushes human groups towards exogamy. Thus, inside a given society, certain categories of kin are forbidden to inter-marry. The incest taboo is thus a negative prescription; without it, nothing would push men to go searching for women outside their inner kinship circle, or vice versa. This theory echoes with Freud's Totem and Taboo (1913). But the incest taboo of alliance theory, in which one's daughter or sister is offered to someone outside a family circle, starts a circle of exchange of women: in return, the giver is entitled to a woman from the other's intimate kinship group. Thus the negative prescriptions of the prohibition have positive counterparts. The idea of the alliance theory is thus of a reciprocal or a generalized exchange which founds affinity. This global phenomenon takes the form of a "circulation of women" which links together the various social groups in one whole: society.

== Elementary structures and complex structures ==
According to Lévi-Strauss's alliance theory, there are two different structural "models" of marriage exchange. Either the women of ego's group are offered to another group "explicitly defined" by social institutions: these are the "elementary structures of kinship". Or the group of possible spouses for the women in ego's group is "indetermined and always open", to the exclusion, however, of certain kin-people (nuclear family, aunts, uncles...), as in the Western world. Lévi-Strauss calls these latter "complex structures of kinship".

Levi-Strauss' model attempted to offer a single explanation for cross-cousin marriage, sister-exchange, dual organisation and rules of exogamy. Marriage rules over time create social structures, as marriages are primarily forged between groups and not just between the two individuals involved. When groups exchange women on a regular basis they marry together, with each marriage creating a debtor/creditor relationship which must be balanced through the "repayment" of wives, either directly or in the next generation. Levi-Strauss proposed that the initial motivation for the exchange of women was the incest taboo, which he deemed to be the beginning and essence of culture, as it was the first rule to check natural impulses; and secondarily the sexual division of labour. The former, by prescribing exogamy, creates a distinction between marriageable and tabooed women and thus necessitates a search for women outside one's own kin group ("marry out or die out"), which fosters exchange relationships with other groups; the latter creates a need for women to do "women's tasks". By necessitating wife-exchange arrangements, exogamy therefore promotes inter-group alliances and serves to form structures of social networks.

Levi-Strauss also discovered that a wide range of historically unrelated cultures had the rule that individuals should marry their cross-cousin, meaning children of siblings of the opposite sex - from a male perspective that is either the FZD (father's sister's daughter in kinship abbreviation) or the MBD (mother's brother's daughter in kinship abbreviation). Accordingly, he grouped all possible kinship systems into a scheme containing three basic kinship structures, constructed out of two types of exchange. He called the three kinship structures elementary, semi-complex and complex.

Elementary structures are based on positive marriage rules that specify whom a person must marry, while complex systems specify negative marriage rules (whom one must not marry), thus leaving a certain amount of room for choice based on preference. Elementary structures can operate based on two forms of exchange: restricted (or direct) exchange, a symmetric form of exchange between two groups (also called moieties) of wife-givers and wife-takers; in an initial restricted exchange FZ marries MB, with all children then being bilateral cross-cousins (the daughter is both MBD and FZD). Continued restricted exchange means that the two lineages marry together. Restricted exchange structures are generally quite uncommon.

The second form of exchange within elementary structures is called generalised exchange, meaning that a man can only marry either his MBD (matrilateral cross-cousin marriage) or his FZD (patrilateral cross-cousin marriage). This involves an asymmetric exchange between at least three groups. Matrilateral cross-cousin marriage arrangements where the marriage of the parents is repeated by successive generations are very common in parts of Asia (e.g. amongst the Kachin). Levi-Strauss considered generalised exchange to be superior to restricted exchange because it allows the integration of indefinite numbers of groups. Examples of restricted exchange are found in some tribes residing in the Amazon basin. These tribal societies are made up of multiple moieties which often split up, thus rendering them comparatively unstable. Generalised exchange is more integrative but contains an implicit hierarchy, for instance amongst the Kachin where wife-givers are superior to wife-takers. Consequently, the last wife-taking group in the chain is significantly inferior to the first wife-giving group to which it is supposed to give its wives. These status inequalities can destabilise the entire system or can at least lead to an accumulation of wives (and in the case of the Kachin also of bridewealth) at one end of the chain.

From a structural perspective, matrilateral cross-cousin marriage is superior to its patrilateral counterpart; the latter has less potential to produce social cohesion since its exchange cycles are shorter (the direction of wife exchange is reversed in each successive generation). Levi-Strauss' theory is supported by fact that patrilateral cross-cousin marriage is in fact the rarest of three types. However, matrilateral generalised exchange poses a risk, as group A depends on being given a woman from a group that it has not itself given a woman to, meaning that there is a less immediate obligation to reciprocate compared to a restricted exchange system. The risk created by such a delayed return is obviously lowest in restricted exchange systems.

Levi-Strauss proposed a third structure between elementary and complex structures, called the semi-complex structure, or the Crow-Omaha system. Semi-complex structures contain so many negative marriage rules that they effectively come close to prescribing marriage to certain parties, thus somewhat resembling elementary structures. These structures are found amongst societies such as the Crow and Omaha native Indians in North America.

In Levi-Strauss' order of things, the basic building block of kinship is not just the nuclear family, as in structural-functionalism, but the so-called kinship atom: the nuclear family together with the wife's brother. This "mother's brother" (from the perspective of the wife-seeking son) plays a crucial role in alliance theory, as he is the one who ultimately decides whom his daughter will marry. Moreover, it is not just the nuclear family as such but alliances between families that matter in regard to the creation of social structures, reflecting the typical structuralist argument that the position of an element in the structure is more significant than the element itself. Descent theory and alliance theory therefore look at two different sides of the same coin: the former emphasising bonds of consanguinity (kinship by blood), the latter stressing bonds of affinity (kinship by law or choice).

== See also ==
- Affinity (law)
- Exchange of women
- Structural anthropology
