= China Women's Federation =

Historical building in Zhongzheng, Taipei, Taiwan

Coordinates: 25°02′25.5″N 121°30′35.0″E

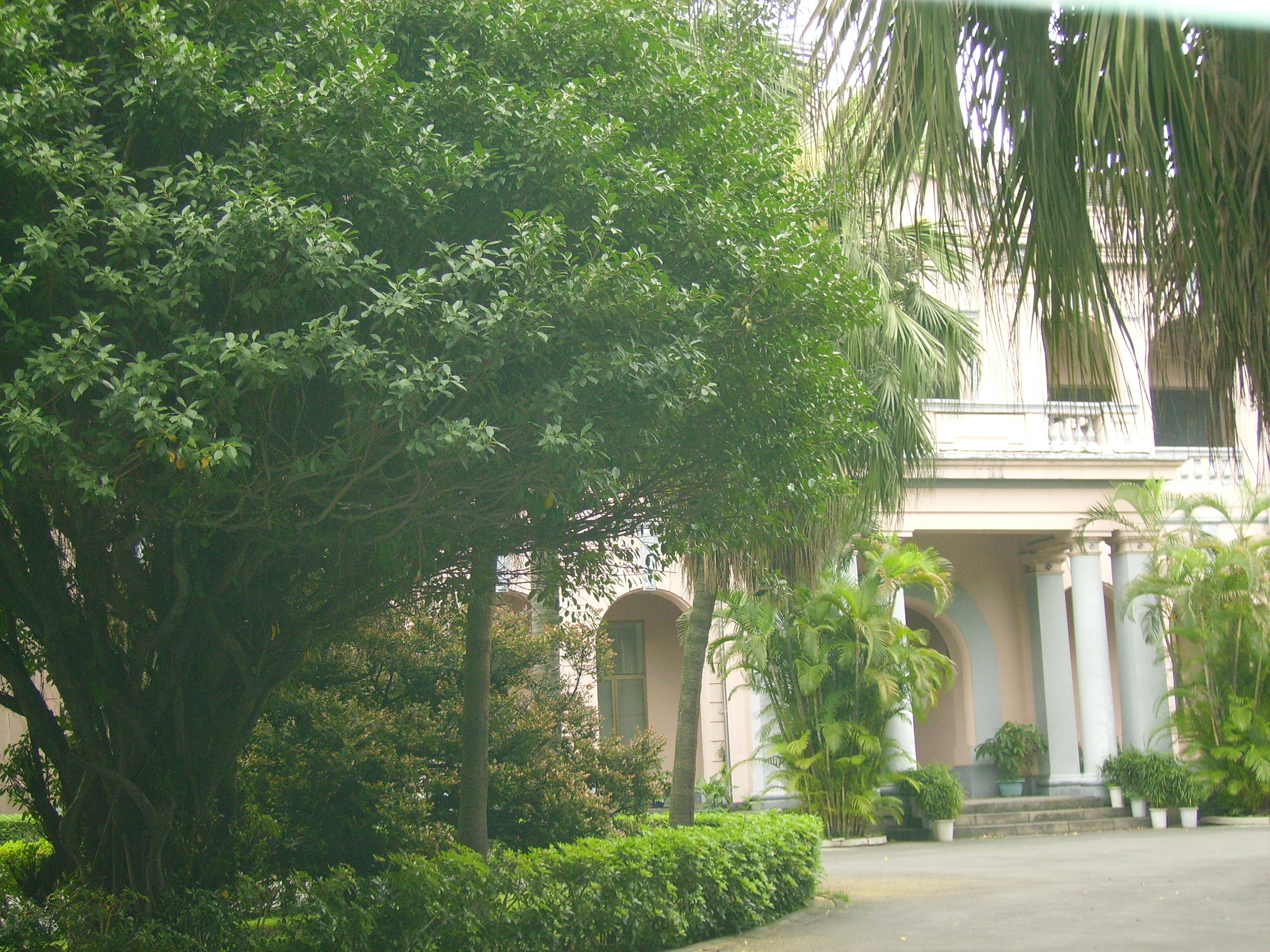
Chinese Women Building

The China Women's Federation (traditional Chinese: 婦聯總會; simplified Chinese: 妇联总会; pinyin: Fùlián Zǒnghuì) building is a registered historic site in Taipei, Taiwan. It is located on Changsha Street in the Zhongzheng District of Taipei.

== History ==
The China Women's Federation was located in the former Deng Ying College, which was built during the Japanese colonial era of Taiwan. The China Women's Federation was known as The Republic of China Anti-Communism Control Russia Women's Federation (中華民國反共控俄婦女聯合會) and was established by Republic of China President Chiang Kai-Shek in 1950. Soong Mei-ling also served as its founder and chairwoman.
