= Matrilateral =

Relatives on the mother's side

The term matrilateral describes kin (relatives) "on the mother's side".

Social anthropologists have underlined that even where a social group demonstrates a strong emphasis on one or other line of inheritance (matrilineal or patrilineal), relatives who fall outside this unilineal grouping will not simply be ignored. So, a strongly patrilineal orientation will be complemented by matrilateral ties with the mother's kin. Likewise within a strongly matrilineal organisation, patrilateral ties will enter the reckoning of relationships as an important balancing factor. This complementarity often has a moral or emotional tone to it: Malinowski's classic studies of the matrilineal Trobriand islanders showed that matrilineal ties were associated with discipline and authority, while patrilateral ties were characterised by nurturance and kindness (at least in principle). Likewise, in Chinua Achebe's novel Things Fall Apart, the hero, Okonkwo, is forced into exile from his own ancestral village to the village of his matrilateral kin who should, by rights, treat him with maternal fondness.

Matrilateral cross-cousin marriage is typically used by anthropologists to describe a form of marriage in which the sons of one consanguineous group marry the daughters of the consanguineous group from which their mother originates. This may take the form of a preference for this kind of cousin marriage or a prescription that this is what will happen. The logical consequences of cross-cousin marriage (matrilateral or patrilateral) for group formation were first discussed in detail by Reo Fortune and have provoked a great deal of debate among social anthropologists including Claude Lévi-Strauss, Edmund Leach and Rodney Needham (alliance theory).
