= Human trafficking in Vietnam =

In 2008 Vietnam was primarily a source country for women and children trafficked for commercial sexual exploitation and forced labor. Women and children were trafficked to the People’s Republic of China (P.R.C), Cambodia, Thailand, the Republic of Korea, Malaysia, Taiwan, and Macau for sexual exploitation. Vietnamese women were trafficked to the P.R.C., Taiwan, and the Republic of Korea via fraudulent or misrepresented marriages for commercial exploitation or forced labor. Vietnam was also a source country for men and women who migrate willingly and legally for work in the construction, fishing, or manufacturing sectors in Malaysia, Taiwan, P.R.C., Thailand, and the Middle East but subsequently face conditions of forced labor or debt bondage. Vietnam was a destination country for Cambodian children trafficked to urban centers for forced labor or commercial sexual exploitation. The country had an internal trafficking problem with women and children from rural areas trafficked to urban centers for commercial sexual exploitation and forced labor. Vietnam was increasingly a destination for child sex tourism, with perpetrators from Japan, the Republic of Korea, the P.R.C., Taiwan, the UK, Australia, Europe, and the U.S. In 2007, an Australian non-governmental organization (NGO) uncovered 80 cases of commercial sexual exploitation of children by foreign tourists in the Sa Pa tourist area of Vietnam alone.

In 2008 the Government of Vietnam did not fully comply with the minimum standards for the elimination of trafficking; however, it is making significant efforts to do so. The government stepped up prosecutions and strengthened cross-border cooperation on sex trafficking with Cambodia, China, and Thailand to rescue victims and arrest traffickers. At the same time, there were some cases in which Vietnamese workers on contracts brokered by recruiters linked to state-licensed companies were exploited and, in its intervention, the government may have focused on upholding its image of Vietnam as an attractive source of guest workers, to the detriment of investigating complaints of trafficking. Vietnam collaborated with law enforcement from Cambodia, the P.R.C, and Laos to rescue victims and arrest traffickers suspected of sex trafficking.

The country ratified the 2000 TIP Protocol in June 2012.

The U.S. State Department's Office to Monitor and Combat Trafficking in Persons placed the country in "Tier 2" in 2017. The country was placed on the Tier 2 Watch List in 2023.

In 2021 more than 60% of trafficked people in the Vietnam-China human trafficking crimes originated from ethnic minorities living in Vietnam, primarily from the Thai and the Hmong.

In 2023, the Organised Crime Index gave the country a score of 7 out of 10 for human trafficking, noting that while the situation had worsened since Covid, the government was not carrying out the minimum international standard work to prevent this crime.

== Sex trafficking in Vietnam ==
Vietnam is one of the countries of origin, and to a lesser extent, destination, and transit for sexually trafficked people. Citizens, primarily women and girls, from many ethnic groups in Vietnam and foreigners have been sex trafficked into other countries in Asia and cases of even different continents. They are forced into prostitution or marriages.

== Prosecution (2008) ==
The Vietnamese government demonstrated increased law enforcement efforts to combat trafficking in persons for sexual exploitation and uneven efforts to combat labor trafficking. Existing laws do not comprehensively cover trafficking in persons; however, various statutes in the Penal Code allow for all forms to be prosecuted. The government’s July 2007 Prime Ministerial Directive 16 directed to the Ministry of Justice to propose draft legislation to the National Assembly on a comprehensive new anti-TIP law and broadened the definition of trafficking in Vietnam to include men, not just women and children. The Directive also imposed a level of accountability on all provincial People’s Committee chairmen for combating trafficking in persons. Penalties prescribed for trafficking both for sexual and labor exploitation are sufficiently stringent and those for sexual exploitation are commensurate with those for other grave crimes, such as rape. The majority of traffickers are prosecuted under Articles 119, 120, and 275 of the Penal Code, which deal with trafficking for commercial sexual exploitation. The government did not report any prosecutions or convictions for crimes of labor trafficking such as forced labor or debt bondage. According to Vietnam’s National Steering Committee on trafficking in persons, in 2007, police investigated 369 cases of sex trafficking involving 930 women and children victims. Police arrested 606 suspected traffickers and prosecuted 178 cases, obtaining 339 individual convictions of trafficking offenders. Nineteen traffickers were sentenced to 15–20 years in prison. The remaining 320 received convictions with sentencing of less than 15 years.

The level of involvement by officials in facilitating trafficking appears to be low. There are occasional reports of border guards taking bribes to look the other way. In April 2007 in Ho Chi Minh City, police disrupted a Korean trafficking ring that fraudulently recruited Vietnamese for marriages, rescuing 118 women. Three separate traffickers were convicted and sentenced from 6–12 years for trafficking women to Macau to allegedly work as masseuses and then forced them into prostitution. Police from Vietnam and Laos cooperated in rescuing eleven women and breaking up a sex trafficking ring that moved women and girls to Malaysia, the Philippines, and Indonesia. In July, the Ho Chi Minh People’s Court convicted six Vietnamese with sentences ranging from 5–12 years for trafficking 126 women to Malaysia under the guise of a matchmaking agency.

== Protection (2008) ==
The Vietnamese government demonstrated growing efforts at protecting victims in 2007, especially for victims of sex trafficking. A number of victim assistance and assessment centers were established in particular border areas. Sex trafficking victims were encouraged to assist in the investigation and prosecution process, as well as file civil suit against sex traffickers. There were no reports of sex trafficking victims being punished or otherwise penalized for acts committed as a direct result of being trafficked. The government still has no formal system of identifying victims of any type of trafficking, but the Vietnam Women’s Union (VWU) and international organizations, including International Organization for Migration (IOM) and UNICEF, continue training the Border Guard Command and local Vietnamese authorities to identify, process, and treat victims.

In 2007, the Government issued Decision No. 17, on receiving and providing assistance to sex trafficking victims returning from abroad. There were reports in February 2008 of a group of over 200 Vietnamese men and women recruited by Vietnamese state-run labor agencies for work in apparel factories in Jordan, who were allegedly subjected to conditions of fraudulent recruitment, debt bondage, unlawful confiscation of travel documents, confinement, and manipulation of employment terms for the purpose of forced labor at their worksite. These conditions led to a worker strike and, subsequently, altercations among workers and with the Jordanian police. Some reports stated that the workers faced threats of retaliation by Vietnamese government officials and employment agency representatives if they did not return to work. The Vietnamese government repatriated the group, after labor negotiations with the Taiwanese employer and Jordanian authorities on behalf of the workers. None of the workers who returned to Vietnam has been detained by the Vietnamese government, which has stated that the workers will not be prosecuted criminally, although they could be subject to civil financial penalties from the recruitment firms due to the breaking of their contracts. There were no reported efforts by the Vietnamese government to consider any of the repatriated workers as possible victims of trafficking. In March 2007, the VWU opened the national “Center for Women and Development” in Hanoi to provide shelter, counseling, financial and vocational support to sex trafficking and domestic violence victims.

The Ministry of Labor, Invalids, and Social Affairs (MOLISA) reported that 422 women and child victims of sex trafficking were repatriated. Officials assigned to Taiwan and the Republic of Korea received briefings on assisting Vietnamese brides. Under the Prime Minister’s Decree 69, steps to protect Vietnamese women from sham or trafficked situations as a result of brokered marriages included heightened due diligence in issuing marriage certificates and steps to ensure that the marriage is voluntary. The Vietnam Women’s Union began a program with its counterpart in South Korea to set up pre-marriage counseling centers and hotlines in key source areas of Vietnam.

== Prevention (2008) ==
The Vietnamese government continued to demonstrate progress in efforts to prevent trafficking through public awareness. International organizations and NGOs continued collaboration with the government to provide training and technical assistance to various ministry officials as well as partnering in public awareness campaigns. The VWU and the Vietnam Youth Union conducted events including advertisements, radio and television campaigns as well as targeted events at schools in high-risk areas. The VWU collaborated with its counterpart in the Republic of Korea to conduct awareness campaigns and establish a hotline for Vietnamese brides. It sponsored a television documentary for women planning to marry foreigners that depicted positive and negative outcomes. Vietnam Television occasionally addresses trafficking in a popular home economics program by featuring returnees who discuss their experiences and how to avoid trafficking. In 2007, Vietnam television worked with MTV EXIT to broadcast a U.S. Government-funded anti-trafficking documentary and awareness campaign.

There were no visible measures undertaken by the government to reduce demand for commercial sex acts. In late 2007, Vietnam established a child sex tourism investigative unit within its Ministry of Public Security. Vietnam actively worked with the USG on a successful prosecution of an American citizen who was a promoter of child sex tourism in Vietnam. A requirement that all tourists staying in hotels register their passports could assist in keeping child sex tourists away from Vietnam; however, many short-stay hotels geared towards prostitution and typically do not require registration.
