= Eho Hamara Jeevna =

1969 novel by Dalip Kaur Tiwana

- Author: Dalip Kaur Tiwana
- Original title: ਏਹੁ ਹਮਾਰਾ ਜੀਵਣਾ
- Language: Punjabi
- Genre: Novel
- Published: 1969

Eho Hamara Jeevna (Punjabi: ਏਹੁ ਹਮਾਰਾ ਜੀਵਣਾ; English Translation: This our life or And Such is Her Fate) is a Punjabi novel written by Dalip Kaur Tiwana. The novel portrays the life of a disadvantaged Punjabi woman named Bhano, whose family sells her off to an abusive husband and then shuns her.

== Plot ==
Bhano, a woman belonging to a poor farmer family in rural Punjab, is the female protagonist of the novel. In her village, women are often treated as a commodity and are sold for little money. Bhano's father was ready to sell his daughter, and so he arranged a marriage between her and Sarban, a resident of Moranwalli village. After her marriage, she faces harassment and torture, with Sarban's friends and brothers also sexually abusing and harassing her. Following Sarban's death, which was caused by a fight with his brothers, Bhano's life becomes more miserable, with her father trying to sell her again, this time to one of Sarban's brothers. Bhano attempts to commit suicide in order to escape, but a man named Narain saves her life and later takes her as his wife without denying her any rights.

== Theme ==
Tiwana attempted to portray the ordinary life of a downtrodden Indian and Punjabi woman in this novel. "She has no kith or kin. Once the bargain is struck, her relationship with her parents also gets detached. She lives on an island of social outcast even in a small village. She belongs to none. But socially and individually, she does not exist, she only 'floats'.", said reviewer Harjeet Singh Gill, commenting on Bhano's character.

== Publication ==
The novel was first published in 1968 and was Dalip Kaur Tiwana's second novel. The novel was translated into English as And Such is Her Fate. Tiwana received Sahitya Akademi Award for the novel in 1971.

== Film adaptation ==
The novel was adapted into a television series that aired from 1996 to 1997 on DD Punjabi. It was also adapted into a film by Om Puri in 2011. Prior to the novel's adaptation as a film, Puri had talked about making a film on the novel, with her saying "Eho Hamara Jeevna looks at the condition of women in Punjab and though the novel was written almost four decades ago, the story still rings truth".
