= Wife selling =

Practice of a husband selling his wife

Wife selling is the practice of a husband selling his wife and may include the sale of a female by a party outside a marriage. Wife selling has had numerous purposes throughout the practice's history; and the term "wife sale" is not defined in all sources relating to the topic.

Sometimes, a man sold his wife to a new husband as a means of divorce, in which case sometimes the wife was able to choose who would be her new husband, provided she chose within a certain time period, and especially if the wife was young and sexually attractive. In some societies, the wife could buy her own way out of a marriage or either spouse could have initiated this form of divorce. Reducing a husband's liability for family support and prenuptial debts was another reason for wife sale. Taxes were sometimes paid by selling a wife and children and paying the value as the required amount, especially when taxes were too high to permit basic survival. Famine leading to starvation was a reason for some sales. Gambling debts could be paid by selling a free or slave wife. A society might not allow a woman the rights reserved to men regarding spouse sale and a society might deny her any rights if her husband chose to sell her, even the right to refuse the sale. A divorce that was by mutual consent but was without good faith by the wife at times caused the divorce to be void, allowing her to then be sold. A husband might sell his wife and then go to court seeking compensation for the new man's adultery with the wife. By one law, adultery was given as a justification for a husband selling his wife into concubinage.

A free wife might be sold into slavery, such as if she had married a serf or her husband had been murdered. Sometimes, a slave-master sold an enslaved wife. Enslaved families were often broken up and wives, husbands, and children sold to separate buyers, often never to see each other again, and a threat to sell a wife was used to keep an enslaved husband under a master's discipline. In wartime, one side might, possibly falsely, accuse the other of wife sale as a method of spying. A wife could also be treated as revenue and seized by the local government because a man had died leaving no heirs. Wife sale was sometimes the description for the sale of a wife's services; it might be for a term of years followed by freedom. If a sale was temporary, in some cases wife sale was considered temporary only in that the sold-and-remarried wife would, upon her death, be reunited with her first husband.

Constraints existed in law and practice and there were criticisms. Some societies specifically forbade wife sales, even imposing death upon husbands violating the law, but a legal proscription was sometimes avoided or evaded, such as by arranging an adoption with a payment and an outcome similar to that of a sale. A society might tax or fine a wife sale without banning it. The nearness of a foreign military sometimes constrained a master in a slave sale that otherwise would have divided a family. Among criticisms, some of the sales (not of services alone but entirely of wives) have been likened to sales of horses. Wives for sale were treated like capital assets or commodities. One law made wives into husbands' chattels. Other sales were described as brutal, patriarchal, and feudalistic. Wife sales were equated with slavery. One debate about the whole of Africa was whether Africans viewed the practice as no crime at all or as against what Africans thought valuable and dear. Some modern popular songs against wife sale are vehicles for urban antipoverty and feminist organizing for rights. A story in a popular collection written by a feminist was about a suggestion for wife sale and the wife's objection to discussing it followed by no wife sale occurring. Another story is about a feminist advocate for justice in which a husband is censored or censured for selling his wife in a gamble.

Wife selling has been found in many societies over many centuries and occasionally into modern times, including the United States (including in Hawaii among the Japanese, among Indians in the Gallinomero, Yurok, Carolina, and Florida tribes and in the Pacific Northwest, and among natives on Kodiak Island in what is now Alaska), Colombia, England, Australia (among aborigines), Denmark (possibly), Hungary, France, Germany, India, Japan, Malaya (among Chinese laborers), Thailand (at least permitted), Northern Asia (among the Samoyads), Asia Minor (among the Yourouk), Kafiristan, Indonesia (albeit not outright), Tanganyika, Congo, Bamum, Central Africa (among the Baluba), Zambia, South Africa (among Chinese laborers), Burkina Faso, Ethiopia, Nigeria (possibly), Abyssinia, Egypt, Lombardy, ancient Rome (sometimes as a legal fiction and sometimes as actual), ancient Greece, and ancient Emar (of Syria). In Rwanda, it was the subject of a wartime accusation. Specific bans existed in Thailand, Indonesia, ancient Rome, and ancient Israel and partial bans existed in England and Japan. Wife sale was a topic of popular culture in India, the U.S., China, Scandinavia, Nepal, Guatemala, and the Dutch Indies.

== History and practice ==
=== England ===
The English custom of wife selling largely began in the late 17th century when divorce was a practical impossibility for all but the very wealthy. In the ritualized form, after parading his wife with a halter around her neck, arm, or waist, a husband would publicly auction her to the highest bidder. Although the custom had no basis in law and frequently resulted in prosecution, particularly from the mid-19th century onwards, the attitude of the authorities was equivocal. At least one early-19th-century magistrate is on record as stating that he did not believe he had the right to prevent wife sales, and there were cases of local Poor Law Commissioners forcing husbands to sell their wives, rather than having to maintain the family in workhouses. The English custom of wife selling spread to Wales, Scotland, Australia, and the United States before dying out in the early 20th century.

=== United States ===
In 1781, in South Carolina, a "Bill of Sale" of a "Wife and Property" for "Two Dollars and half Dozen Bowls of Grogg", the buyer "to have my said Wife for ever and a Day", is, according to Richard B. Morris, "unique of its kind". According to Morris, "although the administration of the law was in a somewhat unsettled state during this ["British"] military occupation [of Charleston], neither at common law nor under the marriage laws then in force in South Carolina would the sale of a wife have been valid". (Note: Common law, a system of law based on precedent and prevalent in England and in the colonial U.S.) The document likely was a way, wrote Morris, for "dissolving the marriage bond" since the state forbade divorce "and the marriage laws of the Church of England were widely disregarded among the poorer whites and in the back country", (Note: Church of England, the church that is official for England by decision of Parliament and that is Christian) but it could also have been intended to reduce the husband's liability for debts for support of the wife and her children and for her pre-wedding debts, while it was unlikely to have been for the sale of a Black slave or an indentured servant, though being for the sale of an Indian woman or a mestizo, while unlikely, was not impossible.

==== Native Americans and other natives ====
The Carolina tribe of Native Americans, according to William Christie MacLeod, as reported in 1925, engaged in debtor slavery, where slave is defined by the Carolinas as "that which is obsequiously to depend on the master for subsistence". According to MacLeod quoting J. Lawson, "if a man takes a widow ... laden with her husband's debts, she seems to have some of the attributes of a chattel, although also a wife. Her husband may .... '... take her for his money paid to her deceased husband's creditors, and sell her to another for his wife'". (Note: Chattel, private movable property, thus not real estate) "[Lawson had] seen several of these bargains driven in a day", and "[Lawson said] you may see men selling their wives as men do horses at a fair, a man being allowed not only to change as often as he pleases but likewise to have as many wives as he is able to maintain."

According to George Elliott Howard, as published in 1904, "if dissatisfied with his wife, the young Gallinomero of [California] ... may 'strike a bargain with another man' and sell her 'for a few strings of shell-money.'" (Note: Shell money, money made of shells or shell pieces) Also according to Howard, as published in 1904, "among the California Yurok 'divorce is very easily accomplished at the will of the husband, the only indispensable formality being that he must receive back from his father-in-law the money which he paid for his spouse.' (Note: Yurok people, an Indian tribe in northwest California)

In the late 17th–mid 18th centuries, among some Indian tribes of the Pacific Northwest, according to Elsie Frances Dennis, two Indians of unspecified tribe or tribes had been killed and "the widow and two daughters of one were wailing, for they were to be sold as slaves." Not all tribes of the region and time sold wives; according to Dennis, "Ross said that he never knew a single instance in which a Chinook or one of the neighboring tribes ever sold his wife".

In 1802–1803, among native people on Kodiak (Kad'iak) Island, in present-day Alaska and that was then part of Russia, according to Gavriil Ivanovich Davydov, "marital fidelity is not always considered a virtue by the islanders ["Koniagas"], and in many cases a husband will sell his wife for a small present."

In Florida, apparently c. in the 16th century, according to an unnamed "eye-witness", among Florida Indians, (Note: That the people described are Florida Indians is not explicitly by the "eye-witness" but is by Cline.) "the ruler has power to give or rather to sell wives to those desirous of marriage." (Note: If the quoted description is inexact and the sale is not of wives but of wives-to-be, this may describe bride-buying.)

In Canada the buying and selling of wives was common practice among Chiefs and wealthier “commoners” in the West Coast tribes.

==== People of African descent ====
According to W. R. Riddell, "a ... man with some Negro blood .... had a ... daughter ... showing little trace of Negro origin. It was understood that she would marry no one but a white man, and that the father was willing to give her a handsome dowry on such a marriage. A person of pure Caucasian stock from the Southern States came to Toronto, wooed and won her. They were married and the husband took his bride to his home in the South. Not long afterwards the father was horrified to learn that the plausible scoundrel had sold his wife as a slave. He at once went South and after great exertion and much expense, he succeeded in bringing back to his house the unhappy woman, the victim of brutal treachery."

Not all people of African descent in the New York City area in 1776–1783 were slaves. In some cases, records may not reveal their status. (Note: They are not revealed in all cases according to Van Buskirk.) A "group of black men ... [were being "court martial[led]" for] killing a white slaveowner (who had just sold the wife of one of the accused in New York City)".

In 1863, William W. Ryan, II, who had opposed slavery and secession and had enlisted into Union military service, was discharged from the military. According to his daughter, Margaret Ryan Kelley, he came home and "brought with him a negro named August", whom he paid. According to her, August said, "his white folks ... had sold his wife 'down the river.' It was a source of constant grief for him.... When he had $200, he intended to return to Virginia and find his people."

===== Black slavery =====
Cases were reported from different states. A slave born in North Carolina who moved 50 miles recalled that, while she was between 5 and 8 years old, "'[w]hile here, he [unspecified who] sold my mother to New Orleans, leaving my father at home.' .... Her master moved to Alabama, and died ..., leaving behind unpaid bills and seven slaves, all of whom a sheriff sold, save for her father", according to Daniel Meaders. (Note: Whether, after a 50-mile journey, the first sale occurred in North Carolina or near the state is unknown.) According to Isaac Johnson, in childhood a slave, his "mother was stolen ... from ... Madagascar", "given" to Johnson's grandfather, evaluated as a "servant", and "bequeathed" to Johnson's father in Kentucky and Johnson's father "used Jane in all respects as a wife and she, in her innocence, supposed she was such". In c. 1851, Johnson's father, who had decided to move and therefore to sell his "farm and stock", ordered the sale of Johnson's mother and her children. No bids were offered for the mother with a 2-year-old child, but when they were separated she was sold for $1,100. Thomas Hughes, according to Meaders and Hopper, was a slave "who had apparently taken a large sum of money" from his Louisiana master and left, after which he was tried and sentenced. During his imprisonment, the master visited him, brought Hughes' wife, and promised that if Thomas Hughes went south the master "'would manumit her' and would not 'attempt to make a slave of him.'" But, according to Meaders and Hopper, [w]hen they reached Baltimore, ... [the master] had sold his wife, and intended to make a slave of him' ... [however,] Hughes left". An "old slave" from "near Memphis" told a soldier (Chauncey H. Cooke) that "his master sold his wife and children to a cotton planter in Alabama to pay his gambling debts, and when he told his master he couldn't stand it, he was tied to the whipping post stripped and given 40 lashes. The next night he ran to the swamps. The bloodhounds were put on his track and caught him .... This happened in sight of Nashville, the capital of Tennessee. I told this to some of the boys and they said it was all bosh, that the niggers were lying to me. But this story was just like the ones in Uncle Tom's Cabin and I believe them. And father knows of things very much like this that are true." According to Mark P. Leone, reviewing a modern-day historical exhibition in Virginia of Carter's Grove plantation, a "slave overseer was kept in place with threats to sell his wife".

On the other hand, during the American Revolution, "blacks who remained with their owners found that with the British army so near, they had leverage with their masters they had never before enjoyed." An "advertisement announced the sale of a young Negro woman with four children. 'They are not sold for any fault,' claimed the seller, but because the woman had a husband in town and the mistress did not want to part them. While it is entirely possible that the owner acted out of humanitarian motivation, her liberality may have been influenced by her slave's enhanced chances for successful flight."

==== Hawaii, among Japanese immigrants ====
Japanese immigration to Hawaii was promoted during the late 19th century, but their number included a low proportion of women. The first generation of Japanese immigrants to the islands (issei) lived at a distance from their original communities. According to Eileen Tamura, this isolation, combined with failure of the expectation of earning enough to return, resulted in a temporary disintegration of social norms, and the disintegration led to wife-selling. The sheriff of the island of Hawaii, E. G. Hitchcock, wrote in 1892 that "I wish to call your attention to the fact, more or less prevalent on this island, of the Japanese selling their wives or mistresses to each other." In 1901 and 1904, the sheriff of Maui wrote that "In connection with Japanese the custom they have of trafficing [sic] in their women, buying and selling their wives is an evil that should be looked into," and proposed that laws explicitly prohibiting wife-selling be enacted. In a personal narrative related by Joan Hori, the question "Why would anyone want a second-hand wife?" was posed; the response was that the prospect of a wife already present in the islands was more certain than that of a picture bride.

=== China ===
The Chinese custom of wife selling or 'selling a divorce' (Chinese: 以财买休) has a long history, spanning both the Imperial and Modern eras.

==== Historic ====
According to 14th-century scholar Wei Su quoted by Paul J. Smith, "early in the dynasty, ... the system for assessing taxes and labor services was based ... on household size. As a result ... the poor got even poorer. Poor folk sold their wives and children to meet their payments to the state".

The earliest documented ban of the practice appears in Yuan Dynasty law dating to the 14th century. At that time, two types of wife selling were recognized, both considered illegal. The first type was when a husband sold his wife to a man with whom she had been committing adultery. The second type was when a husband sold his wife because she had betrayed him or because they were no longer able to get along. During the Ming Dynasty, it was gradually established that only wife selling motivated by adultery should be punished. By 1568, wife selling was explicitly authorized by the law in several circumstances. Authorized wife selling was preserved by Qing Dynasty lawmakers, as was the prohibition against selling a wife to her lover.

Famines are related to wife sale. In 1834, about Kiang-si province, the missionary Mathieu-Ly said of "starvation .... [that] [a]ll crops have been swept away by the inundation of the rivers.... [Some] people ... eat .... [expensive] earth .... The people first sold their wives, then sons and daughters, then their utensils and furniture; finally they demolished their houses in order to dispose of the timber." A 19th-century source characterized the practice as conventional among the lower classes in China: "The poorer people take their wives for an agreed term, and buy and sell them at pleasure."

According to Howard, as published in 1904, "by Chinese law ... when the wife is guilty of adultery .... [if] the woman not be slain, ... the husband may ... sell her as a concubine, provided he has not pandered to the crime or does not sell her to the guilty man."

Also according to Howard, as published in 1904, in China, "a marriage may be dissolved by mutual agreement" "but the agreement ... must be in good faith. Should the wife plan the divorce so as to form a punishable relation with another man, it is void, and the husband may ... sell her to another as in the case of unfaithfulness".

In 1928–1930, in Shaanxi, there was a famine and, according to a local newspaper and Leonard T. K. Wu, peasants who "had already mortgaged and sold all their lands on which they formerly made a living" then sold their wives.

==== Contemporary ====
As the Chinese Communist Party came to power in 1949, wife selling was prohibited and the government took measures to eradicate the practice. During the famines caused by the Great Leap Forward, wife selling occurred in many of the poorer areas. As of 1997, the custom was still occasionally reported in some rural areas of the country.

=== Japan ===
In Tokugawa Japan (1600–1868), according to J. Mark Ramseyer and Takeyoshi Kawashima, "men routinely sold their wives and children or rented them long-term .... [and this] was endemic to the brutality of Asiatic patriarchal feudalism". Ramseyer continued, "sales and adoptions were transfers in perpetuity", the difference being that sales were sometimes legally banned so that adoptions were likely used as an alternative to like effect, with payment in a like direction. Sales were essentially into slavery. Published sales and adoptions known to Ramseyer totalled 52 contracts in 1601–1860, of the 52 35 being of females and 17 being of males, transfers including children, depending on each contract. After 1740, sale "contracts ... largely disappeared", largely because of a growing demand for nonagricultural labor, making absconding or running away easier and more profitable.

=== India ===
In 16th–17th-century Mughal India, according to Irfan Habib, although imperial regulations limited state revenue demands to approximately that which would permit the peasantry to survive, the local collectors often lacked willingness to comply, "violated or evaded" the regulations, and overestimated peasants' ability to pay. Despite at least one order that "prohibit[ed] ... the seizure and sale of the women and children of the combatants", "frequently ... peasants were compelled to sell their women, children and cattle in order to meet the revenue demand.... But the enslavement was not generally so voluntary as even this. 'Villages', we are told, 'which owing to some shortage of produce, are unable to pay the full amount of the revenue-farm, are made prize, so to speak, by their masters and governors, and wives and children sold on the pretext of a charge of rebellion'.... 'They (the peasants) are carried off, attached to heavy iron chains, to various markets and fairs (to be sold), with their poor, unhappy wives behind them carrying their small children in their arms, all crying and lamenting their evil plight.'" (Note: Prizes, in admiralty law, during armed international conflict, the property (such as a ship) which may be captured and kept)

Also, in Bengal, in approximately the same time period, according to Habib, "if any peasant or stranger died without leaving a son [or "died without heirs"] ... his wife and daughters were seized [as a "source of revenue"] for the benefit, depending upon the locality, of the ... ["imperial treasury"], the ... [local "potentate"] or the 'dominant ... ["vassal chief", "landlord", or "chief"]'." This practice, called ankora, may have been abolished.

As reported in 1897 by William Lee-Warner, "husbands sold their wives from motives of enmity as well as gain. The selling price of girls and women was at all times from four to ten times greater than that of males."

In the Western Punjab, in or before 1911, according to A. J. O'Brien, among Muslims, a man "proceeded to sell his wife" to a member of another tribe and a dispute developed on other grounds and was resolved in which "the right of disposal by relatives was freely admitted".

In 2009, there were reports of impoverished farmers in the Bundelkhand region of India selling their wives to settle debts; the frequency of such cases is unknown.

=== Africa ===
In Africa generally, according to Parker Shipton in 1990, "husbands sometimes sell wives [during famines or food shortages], but not vice versa". On the other hand, responding to a charge by David Hume that Africans "think it no crime to sell one another", African philosopher Ottobah Cugoano wrote, "nothing could be more opposite to everything that they hold dear and valuable".

In West Africa, under the Aro Confederacy, according to David Graeber, "a man who simply disliked his wife and was in need of brass rods could always come up with some reason to sell her, and the village elders—who received a share of the profits—would almost invariably concur."

In northern Tanganyika, in the Masai district, in 1955, according to Robert F. Gray, the Sonjo transfer "wives—that is to say, wife rights". Among the Sonjo, wrote Gray, "a lively system of economic exchange .... also encompasses the sale and purchase of rights in women, who in their economic aspects are dealt with much like other commodities." According to Gray, "when a husband dies, his wife rights are inherited by his eldest surviving brother. In this respect wives are dealt with in a different manner from other forms of property .... A brother may take the widow as his wife .... A brother may also sell the wife rights in the widow to another man, but in order to understand this transaction we must consider a mystical aspect of Sonjo marriage. It is believed that when a married person dies he will ultimately be reunited with his spouse in the spirit world. This belief is expressed in a myth: In former times the dead sometimes returned to earth to help their relatives here, but the last spirit to so materialize on earth was insulted and vowed that thereafter the dead would remain forever in the spirit world; she explained before departing that the spirits of dead husband and wives waited in the spirit world for their spouses to die, and were then reunited with them there. This belief has a practical bearing on bride-price transactions. Thus when a husband dies, the brother who inherits the widow may sell his rights in her to another man for the fixed price of thirty goats. This relatively small sum of less than half the woman's normal bride-price is explained by the belief in spirit marriage, for the new husband only acquires full wife rights in the woman in this world; after she dies she will rejoin her original husband in the spirit world. A second husband loses possession of her ghost. [¶] This reduced bride-price for a widow cannot be explained as resulting from a deterioration in her value as a wife." In case of divorce, stated Gray, a "husband exchanges his wife rights with another man for a sum of goats. It is convenient to say that he 'sells' his wife, because the form of the transaction is basically the same as those in which he exchanges or sells other goods. Thus a young wife is treated economically as a commodity. Later in life she outgrows this status, partly because her sexual attractions wane, but of more importance is the fact that her children grow up and are betrothed .... This stabilizes her position in the community". Gray continued, a "young woman's value as a wife is not generally thought to be depreciated just because she was previously married, and a husband in selling a wife attempts to regain the same bride-price that he paid for her, which was originally based mainly on the social status of her parental family ... [with the price subject to] supply and demand .... [Some] restrictions limit the probability of finding a buyer in the same village .... After a buyer has been found, the wife is always given a grace period for finding a more desirable second husband before she is required to marry the man found by her husband. No physical coercion on the part of the husband is involved in the sale of a wife. The compulsive factor resides in the social structure, in which there is no regular position except as a wife for a young woman who was once married. However, a Sonjo husband has a special power, sanctioned by the community, over a wife whom he wishes to sell: if no acceptable buyer can be found within the tribe, he can sell her to the Masai, whose demands for Sonjo women and children seem to provide an unfailing market." (Note: Masai people, an ethnic group in parts of Africa) Gray wrote, "if a woman .... behaves so as to make herself unsatisfactory as a wife she may induce her husband to sell her to another man of her choice, and thus has some means of protecting her own interest. This system of wife purchase is quite flexible in operation and seems to allow a woman as much freedom of choice—admittedly little—as is found in most other African societies." According to Gray, "children ... stay with their mother ... when she is sold and are adopted by her new husband." Gray wrote, "only young wives, childless or with young children, are normally considered saleable, and the price paid usually equals or is near the original bride-price, though that is never exceeded. In at least one case an older woman ["of about forty"] was sold by her husband for a considerably reduced price." Gray continued, "in these divorces ... payment is made ... only to her original husband [not to her father]. The village council, however, levies a tax of seven goats on these transactions .... This fee or tax is no doubt indicative of some underlying disapproval of the selling of wives. Most of these goats, like those collected in fines, are sacrificed .... When wives are exchanged rather than sold, the tax is only four goats ..., which accords with the general opinion that exchanging wives is preferable to selling them."

In East Congo, among the Baguha, as reported in 1926 by Melville J. Herskovitz, if a bride-price is given at marriage and, for a reason, returnable but "is not returned, the man may sell his wife to recover the amount he gave for her, a custom distinctly not East African".

In Bamum, a kingdom, in what is now Cameroon, in the 19th–20th centuries, according to Aboubakar Njiasse Njoya, "in rare cases, ... when a husband was no longer on good terms with his freeborn wife, for whom he had paid a very high brideprice, he simply sold her without informing his parents-in-law." According to Njiasse Njoya, a minority of slaves "were a product of ... disgruntled or dissatisfied husbands." Thus, a freeborn wife was sold into slavery when her husband was no longer on good terms with her. A slave is defined by Njiasse Njoya as "a human being who has been deprived of his freedom and is totally in the possession of his master or state, who uses him at will." A French administrator in 1919 "explained to ["the king"] the French decree ... which prohibited slavery.... [and] demanded [of the king] that husbands cease selling their wives when they no longer satisfy them".

"The Baluba [from the south-east in Central Africa in the 1880s] ... do not understand that there is any wrong in selling their wives and children; as these are property they consider themselves entitled to dispose of them at their pleasure", according to Ludwig Wolf, whose expedition met the Baluba c. or after November, 1884, and in 1885. (Note: Baluba, one of the Bantu-speaking ethnic groups and living in Central Africa) Wolf continued, "since the Baluba have come into contact with the Kioque and Bangala, trading tribes from the Lunda country and from Kuango, they are getting provided with guns and powder, for which they barter children, girls, and even their own wives." (Note: Lunda country, in Africa) Wolf argued to a Baluba chief "how wrong it was to sell their own wives, ... [and the chief said], rather in confidence, that they only sold their troublesome wives out of the country, never the good ones." (The Baluba, said Wolf, distinguished "between domestic slaves and slaves for export .... [by which] [t]he latter are usually troublesome individuals whom they want to get rid of".)

In Southern Zambia, among the Toka, in the early 20th century, according to Gisela Geisler, "often women were ... hired out or even 'sold' against payment of cash to interested men by their own husbands." Geisler continued, "migrant labourers and African public servants ... had a particular interest in 'temporary marriages ....' ... [which] granted them unlimited access to the domestic and sexual services ... [and they] must have been ... fairly common in Livingstone". Geisler continued, "while these practices offered single women some possibilities of survival in town, ... they also meant that women could take on the character of moveable capital assets in the hands of men." (Note: Capital assets, economic resources used to earn money without being sold themselves, thus not including inventory) In the British colonial court established in 1906, "men who claimed to be 'legal' husbands accused 'temporary' husbands of adultery and demanded compensation, particularly if the bartered woman refused to return to her original husband. In one such case, a 'husband' demanded compensation from a 'temporary' husband because the latter had extended the agreed upon time with the former's wife without paying further monies.... Another man, who had sold his wife temporarily to a Lozi, demanded a court order for the return of his wife as well as outstanding payments.... Other husbands accused their wives in court of having misappropriated payments from their 'temporary' husbands." (Note: Barter, economic exchange without money or other medium of exchange) (Note: Lozi, an ethnic group in Africa) In a 1910 case, Geisler reported, a man objected that his daughter's husband "had sold her to another man", not because the father, who was a headman, was "concerned about the moral issue", but because "he had not been paid bridewealth from the new husband." Geisler also reported, in 1912 a rural Toka man's brother had died and the man had inherited his brother's wife and "he had passed the wife on to another man against payment ..., [which was] the exact sum his late brother had paid .... [and] [t]he new husband had sold the woman to yet another man" and a fresh payment was demanded. Geisler found another complication: After the court revised how it dealt with adultery, partly by forcing a divorce on the husband who was suing, and until "the enactment of the Native Court Ordinance of 1929", "husbands, who had previously tried to profit financially from in effect selling their wives to other men and then charging them for adultery compensation before the urban court, now had to fear that bringing such charges might well imply that they lost their wife, the main asset for further deals of the kind." Geisler wrote, "women .... never had access to the money and goods that passed among the hands of men for rights over them, and ... they were not concerned about morality, [so] women could [until the passage of the 1929 law] to a certain extent move between men on their own accord and in their own right."

In South Africa, among Chinese laborers in 1904–1910, according to Gary Kynoch, gambling was "prolific" and unpaid debts often led to suicide and sales of wives and children.

In what is now western Burkina Faso, in Souroudougou, in the 1890s, "household heads often resorted to selling their wives and children to passing merchants for cowries or millett, with no option for re-purchase.... [K]in became actual commodities that were bartered (not loaned) away." (Note: Cowries, sea snails or their shells) (Note: Millett (or millet), a kind of grass used as food) In addition, if a family ("a man, his wife and children") went to the countryside, "bandits who ["often"] hid .... would trap the family, and perhaps kill the man. The mother and her children would be sold as slaves."

In Eastern Ethiopia, wives were sold, a practice apart from that of bride price in Africa.

In southeast Nigeria before it was colonized, according to David Northrup, "goods brought by visiting traders proved irresistible to many. Yet there was little that could be given in exchange for such goods: ivory, salt, fancy textiles, metalware, and, of course, slaves.... For many people slaves were the only real possibility. The more venturesome or powerful might hope to ... sell an adulterous wife .... But ... [this] would not have been within the range of possibilities open to the average person."

In southeast Nigeria, in a practice referred to as money marriage, a girl, usually, is married off to a man to settle debts owed by her parents.

=== Latin America ===
In Colombia under Spanish colonial rule, particularly in 1750–1826, according to David L. Chandler, Spanish law "allowed slaves to marry and establish a family even against the master's wishes ... and prohibited ... [the family's] separation through sale.... [S]eparation of the slave family was not very common." If a slave couple was broken up by the sale of one spouse out of an area, Chandler wrote, the other spouse, even after 10 years, could petition a court to allow the latter slave to find a buyer so the couple could reunite; such cases, in which the wife was sold first and the husband second, were litigated in 1802 and 1806. In 1808, reported Chandler, a master had sold a slave husband to another master; after a dispute between the slaves and the selling master, the master who sold the husband was subsequently ordered by a court to sell the slave's wife to the other master as well, so the slave family would be able to live together and not merely have visits; and the court order was complied with.

=== Ancient Rome ===
In ancient Rome, the 'power of life and killing' (vitae necisque potestas, more commonly 'power of life and death') was vested in the husband over his wife in some circumstances, the husband being the pater familias or 'head of the household'. (Note: According to Richard P. Saller, pater familias more frequently meant 'owner of an estate' regardless of family relations. Thus, a pater familias could be female.) According to Keith Bradley, Augustine wrote that "there was a man (a Christian at that) who had sold his wife into slavery because he preferred to have the cash". According to Edward Gibbon, in the earlier period of Eastern Roman society, a husband could sell his wife, because she was counted among his children and he could sell them. (Note: "In the first ages the father of a family might sell his children, and his wife was reckoned in the number of his children: the domestic judge might pronounce the death of the offender, or his mercy might expel her from his bed and house; but the slavery of the wretched female was hopeless and perpetual, unless he asserted for his own convenience the manly prerogative of divorce.") According to Bruce W. Frier and Thomas A. J. McGinn, "it was apparently illegal for a husband to sell his wife [if in manus], to give her in adoption, or to execute her even for serious misconduct without first consulting a consilium of relatives," thus possibly lawful after the consilium. (Note: A consilium is, apparently most relevantly, a "private meeting" when it is of a small group of people; if it is of many people, it is a "popular assembly" or a "public meeting or gathering"; or it may be a "hearing in council", "debate", or "deliberation".) However, according to Paul du Plessis, "the husband did not have the power of life and death over his wife; nor could he sell her into slavery...." According to Frier and McGinn, a wife had a socially respected position as mater familias, (Note: A mater familias is a 'respectable married woman', 'matron', or 'mistress of a household'. The term is not semantically identical with uxor or matrona but may represent a subset or may not require wifehood or being free or freed.) "although ... her position was weak in law". According to Jane F. Gardner, "over a wife in free marriage ... ["her husband"] had no potestas [power] at all." However, according to Mireille Corbier, "in the framework of free marriage, a practice that became frequent in the late republican period, the wife ... remained in her father's familia."

=== Babylon ===
In Babylon, around the 1700s BC, the law that applied was King Hammurabi's Code. According to Étan Levine, "Hammurabi law ... permitted a wife to be sold to pay her husband's debts", although an earlier view (possibly outdated or not agreed with by all scholars) was that the law may have been relatively limited, providing only that the wife sale was limited to the sale of her services, Theophile J. Meek arguing in 1948 that the law should be "translated somewhat as follows: .... § 117: 'If an obligation came due against a seignior and he accordingly sold (the services of) his wife ... they [e.g., "his wife"] shall work (in) the house of their purchaser or obligee for three years, with their freedom re-established in the fourth year'" and another view was that the law created an indenture, not a sale, being for a limited duration. Specifically, according to Ernst J. Cohn in 1938, "if a man contracted a debt and sold his wife, son or daughter or gave them to work it off, 'for three years they work in the house of their buyer or exploiter and in the fourth year he shall restore them to their former condition.'"

=== International theology ===
==== Christianity ====
In Christianity, according to Frederik Pijper in 1909, "one way [to "become a slave"] was by selling oneself because of poverty. It might so happen that a married pair sank into such need that the husband was compelled to sell himself, and did so with his wife's consent. In this way he secured sustenance for himself, and with the purchase-money he was in a position to keep his wife from starving. Sometimes the conditions were reversed, and the wife sold herself with the same intentions and with her husband's consent. In such cases the marriage was usually dissolved; to be sure the Church opposed this, but could not prevent and therefore yielded to it.... A synod at Paris early in the seventh century ordained that freemen who had sold ... themselves should if they repaid the money at once be restored to their former status. To demand back a greater sum than what had been paid for them, was not allowed."

Contrasting women by rank or class and noting which wives were sold and which were not, Pijper wrote of the medieval Church, a "woman of noble rank who had deserted her husband three times was to be put under penance, and was to be prohibited from marrying again; but if she was a woman from the people she must be sold without hope of regaining her freedom". (Note: Penance, a repenting of sins (violations of God's will) or a religious sacrament for the repenting)

The parable of the unforgiving servant, attributed to Jesus, according to David Graeber, told of a creditor ordering the sale of a man who is both his debtor and his servant along with the sale of the man's wife, children, and property.

=== Other cultures ===
Wife selling occurred in Europe in addition to that in Britain:

- In Hungary, in 1114, the Synod of Gran said, "When a wife of noble birth or aristocracy has left her husband for the third time, she receives mercy, but when she is from the common people, she is sold."
- As to France, "scattered records of wife sales in western France do exist", many of the locations being rural, notwithstanding the tendency of many French to criticize the English for the latter's custom.
- Germans "considered the wife as negotiable property ... [and] sold them to the conquering Romans". According to E. J. Schuster in 1910, "under the original Germanic law .... the husband was entitled to dismiss and even to sell his wife on the ground of her adultery .... [and] [t]he introduction of Christianity into Germany did not immediately put an end to this state of things." According to Paul G. Gleis in 1930, in early Teutonic society, regarding fathers, "selling a wife and child was a measure only of last resort."
- "A Lombard [according to Gleis] ... killed a man serf once who ventured to marry a free woman, and sold the serf's wife into slavery." (Note: Lombard, a person of Lombardy, northern Italy)
- In ancient Greece, according to N. G. L. Hammond, "the Thebans [of Thebes] proceeded to annihilate the Orchomenians and sell their wives and children into slavery"; (Note: Orchomenus, an archaeological site and municipality in Boeotia, Greece) (Note: Although not directly disagreeing with Hammond on the word "wives", another view is that the word was "women", according to Diodorus.) this "and similar acts ... led Polybius to criticize 'the mob' ... as Thebes as 'having been schooled in violence and passion'".
- In Denmark, c. 1030, according to Gleis, Canute made a law that "neither woman nor maid shall be forced to marry one that is disliked by her nor shall be sold for money unless the bridegroom gives something of his own free will", although "whether buying and selling was originally really involved is [in 1930] still disputed."

In Kafiristan, which was east of Afghanistan, in the 19th century, a divorce was "easy" and was done by the husband selling a wife. If a husband died, when the wife or wives "revert[ed]" to the husband's family, surviving brothers either "sold or retained" the wives.

In Malaya, Chinese laborers in the 1880s–1890s, according to Kynoch, "were said to have been prolific gamblers .... [and] 'many of those who failed to pay off their gambling debts ... either committed suicide or sold their wives and children to pay off their debts'".

In Thailand, from the mid-13th century until 1932, according to Darunee Tantiwiramanond and Shashi Pandey, because "traditional Thai law ... decreed that women were mere chattels of men" and thus "women were considered part of a man's assets ... and hence were subjected to male overlordship", "a husband or a father could sell his wife or daughter without her consent.... The logic of the law, however, did not operate in reverse and did not apply in the case of the wife because she was not a legal entity and had no identity in her own right."

In Northern Asia, according to an 1895 report by Arthur Montefiore, among Samoyads (or Samoyedi) (who are part of the Ural-Altaic Mongoloids), "[the husband] may commerce with his wife, for marriage is not considered a binding tie. It is not uncommon for a Samoyad to sell his wife to another for the consideration of a few teams of deer, and he sometimes barters her for a lady whose husband may be willing to accept the view that exchange is no robbery."

In the Republic of Vietnam (South Vietnam), Tuân Sắc in 1969 "argued, '[t]here are those who sell their wives and children for money, even women who sell their husbands for a little spending money (it's all in the newspapers)'" and posited that such people are not, or are no longer, Vietnamese.

In Indonesia, among the Nias, according to E. M. Loeb citing J. B. Neumann from 1886, a husband was allowed to "pawn ... [his wife] as a pledge for his debts", but not to sell her "outright".

In ancient Emar, Syria, in the late 14th- to early 12th-centuries BCE, in the Late Bronze Age, "debtors sold their wives" "into slavery". In or near ancient Emar, according to Gary Beckman, a cuneiform tablet documented an instance of a husband selling his wife "into the service of" another man, for whom she was to be "the servant", "dead or living", with a provision that if she be redeemed the redeemer was to provide "one healthy woman ... in compensation".

An Old Testament passage describes an event in Egypt as an instance of wife selling. According to Theodore Y. Blumoff, Genesis describes "some pretty deplorable characters who do dreadful things to each other ... [including a] candidate for future sanctification selling his wife—not once but twice—to save his own skin and make a buck".

== Ambiguous and related reports ==
=== Ancient Rome ===
In ancient Rome, in two situations, a "fictitious" sale was an actual procedure. In one, to get rid of a tutor (a person responsible for approving of a female's decisions that might, e.g., reduce her assets), as a way of getting a replacement tutor, "the woman [including a wife] undergoes a formal and entirely fictitious 'sale' (coemptio) in which she sells herself to [a] third party, who then remancipates her to another person, who 'manumits' her and thereafter becomes her "fiduciary guardian" (tutor fiduciarius); that is, he replaces her original tutor." The procedure was also used for the making of a will when a wife wanted some of her property upon her demise to go not to her birth family but to her husband (and perhaps to her children). "How frequently women made use of ... ["this ["contrived"] ceremony"] we have no way of telling, but we often hear of women's wills from [the years of] the late Republic on." "Hadrian (reign: AD 117–138) had enacted a decree of the Senate that abolished the need for the 'sale'". (Note: Hadrian, Roman emperor) "Classical law ... usually treat[ed]... the sale of free persons as void".

One of three forms of manus marriage was coemptio, which, according to Gary Forsythe, seems to have existed in the mid-5th century BC and into the CE 2nd century. According to Gardner and Marcia L. Colish, coemptio was in essence a fictitious notional sale of the woman to the husband that could occur at any time during their marriage, thus, if after marriage, a fictitious notional sale of the wife to her own husband. According to du Plessis, "a ceremonial resale of the wife terminated marriage by coemptio (and probably by usus, too)", (Note: Usus, long-established rule, practice, or custom) as a reversal of the marriage procedure.

Theophanes claimed that in the 5th century Theodosius II, emperor of the Eastern Roman Empire, may have been managed or tricked into signing unread a contract "selling" his wife Aelia Eudocia into slavery or giving her to Pulcheria so Pulcheria could sell his wife; after the signing, Pulcheria "gave ... [Theodosius] a mighty scolding" and the sale or gift is not known to have occurred.

In ancient Rome, according to Gail Hamilton, Cato gave his wife to Hortensius, who married her, after which, when Hortensius was dying, he left all his property to her and, when she was widowed, Cato remarried her; and Caesar "["taunt[ed]"] Cato .... [for] having sold his wife for Hortensius's gold."

=== Medieval Christians ===
Regarding a married man's consortium with a slave who may have thereby borne sons, Pijper wrote of medieval Christians, "according to Vinniaus the married freeman who had consorted with a slave should be compelled to sell the woman; [but] if he had one or several sons by her he must set her free, and was not allowed to sell her." Women consorting with churchmen were to be sold by bishops; Pijper reported, "some churchmen, not living in honorable wedlock, consorted with strange women or their own slaves. Bishops were instructed to secure such women and sell them. This hard law was promulgated in Spain, at the beginning of the seventh century." A subdeacon's wife was to be enslaved by a prince, according to Pijper; "if a subdeacon refused to give up his wife, he was to be removed from his ecclesiastical office and benefice. If, however, after being warned by his bishop, he still failed to yield, his wife was to be made a slave by the prince."

The buying the freedom of a slave being from another party's perspective the selling the slave into freedom, the medieval church permitted the selling into freedom of a slave who was a spouse; according to Pijper, "if ... two slaves were joined in wedlock by their common master, and one of them was thereafter freed, that one was permitted to marry again, if the freedom of the other could not be bought."

=== Other cultures ===
In Asia Minor, administered by Turks, among the Yourouks, as reported in 1891 by Theodore Bent, "on marriage the husband generally pays something to the father, and this has given rise to the idea that the nomads ["Yourouks"] are in the habit of selling their wives for the harems of Constantinople, whereas they are only carrying out their legitimate idea of the marriage contract." (Note: Harems, forbidden places for females only) (Note: Constantinople, capital of the Byzantine or Eastern Roman Empire) On the other hand, wives are often slaves; according to Bent, "poor though he is, a man will often have seven wives, or more properly speaking, seven slaves."

In Palestine of the 1st century, according to Graeber, it was not "normal" "for a man ... to be able to sell his wife".

On an Abyssinian couple met in northeast Africa, in 1899–1900, according to James J. Harrison, "we [the first white men ever seen in the country] ... encountered an Abyssinian gentleman, who, having nothing else to sell us, tried to sell his wife. After repeated attempts, he and the good lady, looking crestfallen at not even raising a bid, proceeded on their journey."

In Australia, in 1880–1884, among aborigines in Queensland, according to Carl Lumholtz, "at Herbert River the blacks did not know, before the arrival of the whites, of any stimulants at all. The tobacco served me instead of money, and for it they would do anything, even to selling their wives." (Note: Stimulants, psychoactive drugs meant to improve physical or mental functioning)

In Szabolcs, in the 11th century, a substitute for a wife could be sold, with the gain going to religious leadership. "According to the synod of Szabolcs (1092), if a priest instead of taking a wife had chosen a servant or a slave as a companion, she was to be sold and the proceeds were to be given to the bishop."

== Enemy claims ==
These are claims by enemies in war (including civil war) and which may not have been true even to a small degree, but which were widely made.

In Rwanda, up to 1994, according to Erin K Baines, Hutus accused Tutsis, identified as enemies, by saying, "Tutsi sold their wives ... to the Hutu authorities. Tutsis tried to marry their wives to Hutu elite in order to have spies in the inner circle."

== Bans of wife sale ==
Most bans are implied in bans against sales of human beings that by definition include sales of wives, and such more general bans are too numerous to list here. Some bans, however, are explicitly against wife sale.

=== Thailand ===
In Thailand, "only in 1935, under pressure from the West, were ... men forbidden from selling their wives into prostitution".

=== Indonesia ===
In Indonesia, among the Nias, according to Loeb citing Neumann from 1886, "the only restriction which the husband had to observe is that he was not allowed to sell his wife outright", but was allowed to "pawn her as a pledge for his debts".

=== South African Kaffirs ===
Among the Kaffirs, as studied in the Cape Colony by the South African government in 1883, "the husband cannot sell his wife nor ill-treat her"; divorce exists but is rare.

=== Ancient Rome ===
In ancient Rome, according to Jörg Rüpke, "a husband selling his wife" was a "crime ... that [would have] affect[ed] fundamental social relationships," in which the wife as "the harmed one is in an inferior position". Thus, according to Rüpke, "by the sacer-esto-formula, a curse declaring someone outlawed[,].... the delinquent" may be killed by anyone. Specifically, according to Rüpke, "if somebody has sold his wife, he shall be sacrificed to the lower gods". The enactment of "the law that whoever sold his wife should be given over to the infernal gods" was, according to John Andrew Couch in 1894, credited to Romulus. According to Alan Watson in 1972, "anyone who sold his wife was to be dedicated [apparently 'sacrificed'] to the gods of the underworld." "The husband who sold his wife was to be sacrificed (if we may so translate Plutarch ...) to the infernal deities", according to Fowler in 1911. According to Rüpke, this judgment and punishment reflected and was legitimized by religion. However, after a while, the offense was no longer punished; according to Mary Emily Case, "this very primitive kind of justice [in which "one who violated these rules ["of the fas,—that is, of religious duty"] was pronounced accursed, and might be killed by any who met him"] soon fell into disuse, and offences which were merely nefas—such, for example, as selling a wife—ceased to be punished. Thus, fas early lost the force of law."

=== Ancient Israel ===
In ancient Israel, according to Levine, a man "could never sell a wife, even if she had originally been a war captive"; at least he could not sell her to an "outsider", although redemption was possible.

However, ambivalently, N. P. Lemche argued that "either there are no rules for a Hebrew's selling his wife ..., or ... [this category is] incorporated in the law ... in the way that it was considered impossible that a man should be able to sell his wife and remain free himself".

=== Partial bans ===
Bans, whether against wife sales specifically or against all sales of human beings, that were only in effect part of the time or that were substantially violated and unenforced are too numerous to list. Examples include bans in England, often violated and generally unenforced for a time, and Japan, by law having no ban for a time.

== Popular culture ==
=== United States ===
An undated doggerel from Western Pennsylvania was reported by H. Carrington Bolton as "Pontius Pilate, King of the Jews",/"Sold his wife for a pair of shoes."/"When the shoes began to wear"/"Pontius Pilate began to swear." (Note: Pontius Pilate, Roman Judean prefect in AD 26–36) Bolton received it after publishing other rhymes used by children for "counting-out". (Note: Counting-out, part of a simple game and often used to designate one person as "it") Variants on the rhyme have also been reported, including from Salt Lake City c. 1920 and Los Angeles c. 1935, the variants naming "Holy Moses" (Note: Moses, a religious leader said to have authored the Torah) instead of "Pontius Pilate", and some women reported their use "as rope-skipping and ball-bouncing rhymes".

In the U.S., a folktale titled The Man Who Sold His Wife For Beef, narrated by two informants, and that possibly was true although "suspect[ed]" to be only a folktale, was told in 1952 by Mrs. Mary Richardson, living in Calvin Township, southwestern Michigan, which town was a destination for slaves travelling through the Underground Railroad and in which town most residents and local government officials were Black. As told to Richard M. Dorson, in Clarksdale, (Note: Alternatively, it happened in Itta Bena, Mississippi, according to a similar folktale as told by James D. Suggs to Dorson.) Cohoma [sic] County, (Note: Perhaps should be spelled as Coahoma County) northern Mississippi, (Note: Richardson was raised partly in Mississippi.) c. 1890 or c. 1897–1898, (Note: Richardson told story when she was age 70, 71, or 79 and said event occurred when she was "about" 16.) a husband killed his wife and sold some parts to people to eat as beef, and the husband was caught and executed.

The plot of the 1969 western-musical film "Paint Your Wagon" treats the subject satirically.

The ride Pirates of the Caribbean at Disneyland originally contained a "Wife Auction". It was removed in 2017.

=== India ===
In 1933, Sane Guruji (born as Pandurang Sadashiv Sane), of Maharashtra, India, authored Shyamchi Ai, a collection of "stories", which, according to Guruji, were "true ... [but with] ... a possibility of a character, an incident or a remark being fictitious." One of the stories was Karja Mhanje Jiwantapanicha Narak (Indebtedness is Hell on Earth), in which, according to Shanta Gokhale, a man borrowed money from a moneylender, had not paid principal or interest, and was visited by the moneylender's representative who demanded full payment and "shamelessly suggested", "if you sold you[r] wife's bangles to build a house, you can sell your wife now to repay your debts", his wife, hearing this, came to where her husband and the moneylender's representative were talking and said, "aren't you ashamed to talk about selling wives? Have you no control over your tongue?", no wife sale occurred, and a partial monetary payment was made to the moneylender's representative. According to Gokhale, in 1935–1985 ("55 years") ( [sic]), "every middle-class home in Maharashtra is said to have possessed a copy of Shyamti Ai and every member of every such household may be assumed to have read it.... [and it] was also made into a film which instantly received the same kind of adoring viewership." According to Sudha Varde or Sadanand Varde, Guruji was one of "only two men ["even in the Seva Dal"] who could be called feminists in the real sense", (Note: Seva Dal, a grassroots political organization in India and related to the Congress Party) because "Guruji ... respected women in every way .... [and] had a real awareness of the lives, of women and the hardships they had to bear"; these statements were, according to Gokhale, published as part of "some indication of the widespread influence Shyamchi Ai has had in Maharashtra."

In southeastern India, in the Tanjavur region, often described as the main part of Tamil society, according to Sanjay Subrahmanyam, Shahaji Bhonsle, who ruled Tanjavur 1684–1712, in the early 18th century wrote Satidânashûramu ('The Gifting of the Virtuous Wife'), a play in the Telugu language, for an annual festival at a temple. Subrahmanyam says that, in the play, a member of the Untouchable (Dalit) caste offers to "donate" his wife to a Brahmin and asks whether Harishchandra "didn't ... sell his wife for truth", although the Brahmin announces that he must refuse the gift and ultimately the wife's "virtue remains unsullied".

In Indian literature, Mahabharata, a story of Gandhari, according to Jayanti Alam, includes the "censor[ing] [sic]" (or censuring) of "Yudhishtira ... for 'selling' his wife in the gamble". According to Alam, "Rabindranath's Gandhari is ... a feminist" and "Gandhari's feminism reaches its sublime height and she emerges the apostle of justice".

According to Jonathan Parry in 1980, "in the famous legend of Raja Harish Chandra, it was in order to provide a dakshina that, having been tricked into giving away all his material possessions in a dream, the righteous king was forced to sell his wife and son into slavery and himself become the servant of the cremation ghat Dom in Benares." (Note: Dakshina, compensation for priestly service) (Note: Benares (or Varanasi), a city on the Ganges river, India)

=== Elsewhere ===
In China, according to Smith, a "possibly well-known tale" about the Song dynastic era (AD 960–1279) told of a wife invited to a prefect's party for wives of subordinate officials, from which she "was kidnapped by a brothel-master", (Note: Brothel-master, the manager of a place where prostitution is provided) who later "sold her ... [to] her husband's new employer ... who reunite[d] ... the couple".

In 1990, in Central Nepal, mainly in rural areas, one song, a "dukha", which is a "suffering/hardship" song that "provide[s] ... an interpretation of women's hardships", "underscore[d] ... the limited resources and rights of a wife caught in a bad marriage". Sung from a daughter's perspective, the song in part said, "[The wife says] You don't need to return home after drinking there in the evening."/"In Pokhara bazaar, [there is] an electricity line,"/"The household property is not mine."/"The housewife is an outsider,"/"All the household property is needed [for raksi]."/"If this wife is not enough, you can get another,"/"The head of the cock will be caught [i.e., with two wives he'll have problems]."/"Why do you hold your head [looking worried]? Go sell the buffalo and pigs."/"If you don't have enough money [for raksi], you will even sell your wife."/"After selling his wife, he'll become a jogT [here: a beggar without a wife]." (Note: Pokhara, a major city in Nepal) A "woman ... became visibly agitated while listening to [this song]". This was part of a genre sung at the annual Tij Festival, by Hindu women in the mid to late 20th century, but mostly not between the festivals. According to Debra Skinner and co-authors, "this genre ... has been recognized by urban-based political and feminist groups as a promising medium for demanding equal rights for women and the poor." (Note: Political, related to the governing of people) (Note: Feminist, related to equal rights for women)

In Guatemala, according to Robert G. Mead, Jr., a "legend [that is] popular ... [is] the story of the poor man who becomes rich by selling his wife to the Devil." This legend, according to Mead, is also one basis of the 1963 novel Mulata de tal, by Miguel Angel Asturias, a winner in 1967 of the Nobel Prize in Literature.

In the Dutch Indies, fiction by Tirto Adhi Soerjo, who was Javanese and writing in a language that "was a form of resistance to Dutch", according to Laurie J. Sears, included in 1909 Membeli Bini Orang: Sebuah Cerita Yang Sungguh Sudah Terjadi Di Periangan (Buying Another Man's Wife: A Story that Really Happened in the Priangan), in which "a religious Muslim ... tries to get rid of his wife, whom a dukun said was not good for him .... [noting that since his marriage after his prior widowhood] all his business efforts have turned into failures .... [and] he agrees to give or sell his wife to a greedy Eurasian (=Indo) moneylender who has fallen in love with her.... [She, as the first man's wife,] is a very promiscuous woman, easily impressed with money and fashionable clothing, and the Eurasian ends up feeling more than punished for his pursuit and purchase of another man's wife." (Note: A dukun, a shaman, one who interacts with the spirit world)

In Scandinavia, in c. 1850s–1870s, where there were many critics of the Mormon religion, "ballad mongers hawked 'the latest new verse about the Copenhagen apprentice masons' who sold their wives to the Mormons for two thousand kroner and riotously drowned their sorrows in the taverns".

In English author Thomas Hardy's 1886 novel The Mayor of Casterbridge, the mayor's selling of his wife when he'd been a young, drunken labourer is the key plot element.

== Criticism ==
A wife being subject to sale was a consequence of her being a man's property, according to sociologist Alvin John Schmidt. The religious commandment in the Hebrew Bible against coveting one's neighbor's wife has as part of its basis that "the wife is definitely seen as property", wrote Schmidt. Christians and earlier Hebrews were, according to Schmidt, influenced by the belief that "woman [was] ... unequal to man", producing "sexist theology". Schmidt argued that teachers of Judeo-Christian tradition who teach on this commandment "without drawing attention to the property concept of woman" "might [be] ... unknowingly contributing to sexual inequality". Inequality and inferiority are, according to Schmidt, "negative".

Wife selling was criticized by the Roman Catholic Pope Gregory VII in the 11th century, and the Catholic church over time objected to it, apparently because it objected to divorce, while the non-Catholic Christian church sometimes did not oppose it.

According to Robert G. Ingersoll, writing in 1881, "to sell wives ... is slavery. This is what Jehovah 'authorized in Judea.'"

Karl Marx argued that machinery adds so many women and children to the workforce that men are displaced and thus, according to Michael Burawoy, "all that the father can do is sell his wife and children." Then, according to Marx, "he has become a slave dealer."

== See also ==
- The Babylonian Marriage Market
- The Bartered Bride, 1866 comic opera by Smetana
- Bride buying
- Bride kidnapping
- Child-selling
- Commodification
- Coverture, where, on marriage, a woman's rights are subsumed by her husband's
- Exchange of women
- Human trafficking
- Husband-selling
- Organ trade
- Self-ownership
- Sexual slavery
- Widow inheritance
