= Dalip Kaur Tiwana =

Indian writer (1935–2020)

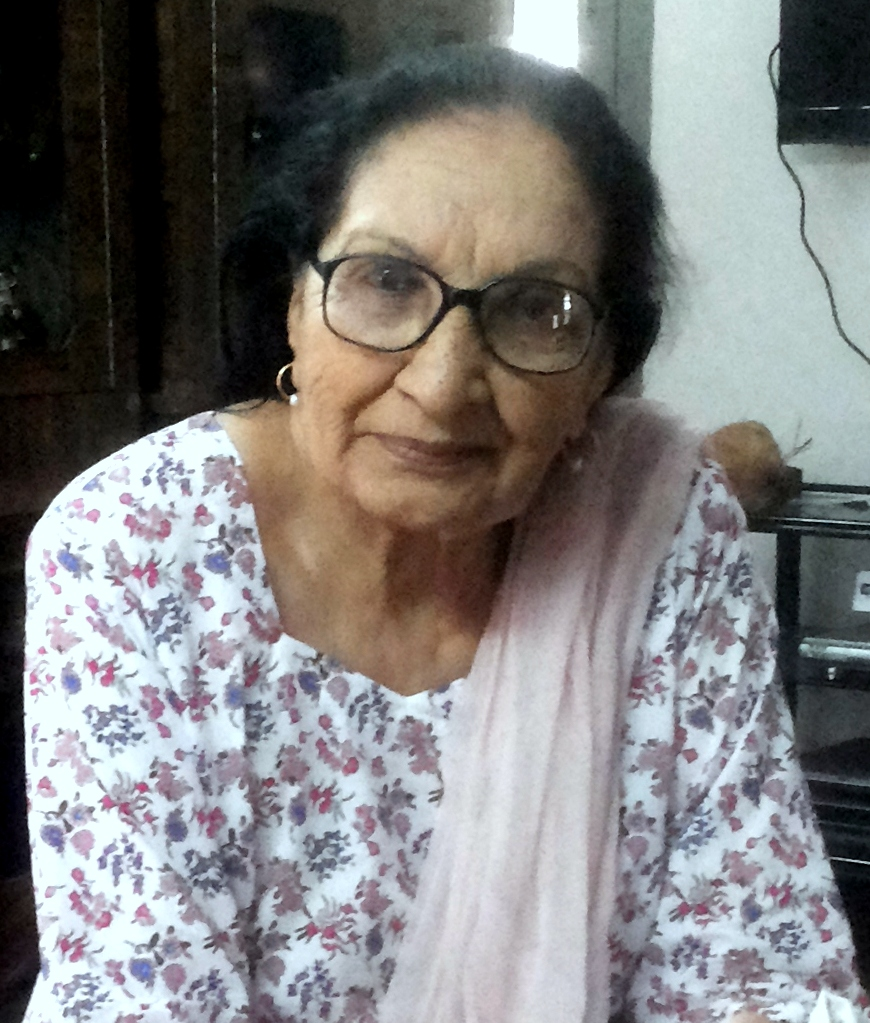
- Born: 4 May 1935; Rabbon, Ludhiana District, Punjab, British India
- Died: 31 January 2020 (aged 84)
- Occupations: novelist, short-story writer
- Writing career
- Genres: novel, short-story

Dalip Kaur Tiwana (4 May 1935 – 31 January 2020) was one of the foremost novelists and short-story writers of contemporary Punjabi literature. She won awards, both regional and national, and was a widely translated author. She retired as Professor of Punjabi, and Dean, from Punjabi University, Patiala. She is widely credited as a tour-de-force in the creation of the contemporary literature in the Punjabi language.

== Biography ==
Dalip Kaur Tiwana was born on 4 May 1935 in the village of Rabbon in the Ludhiana district of Punjab in a well-to-do land-owning family in British India. She was educated at Patiala, where her uncle, Sardar Sahib Tara Singh Sidhu was Inspector General of Prisons. She had a distinguished academic career. She earned first class honors in the pursuit of her M.A., and then received a PhD degree from the Panjab University, Chandigarh.

In 1963, she joined the Punjabi University, Patiala as a lecturer and then went on to become professor and head of the department of Punjabi, and dean, faculty of languages. She was also a UGC National Lecturer for a year. She often lectured in England, United States, and Canada where she also received awards for her contributions to the literature.

She was married to sociologist and poet and professor Bhupinder Singh and has a son Dr Simranjit Singh, who is an assistant professor of electronics engineering at Punjabi University. Dr. Tiwana lived with her family on the campus of Punjabi University, Patiala, where she was life fellow and writer-in-residence.

On 14 October 2015, she renounced her Padma Shri award (the highest honor for an Indian writer bestowed by the country) against increasing 'intolerance' in the country. She received this award in 2004 for her contribution to literature and education.

== Collection ==
=== Novels ===
1. Agni Prikhya
2. Eho Hamara Jiwna
3. Waat Hamari
4. Teeli da Nishaan
5. Sooraj te Samandar
6. Doosri Seeta
7. Within Without
8. Sarkandyaan de Des
9. Dhupp Chhaan te Rukh
10. Sabh Des Paraya
11. Hey Ram
12. Lambi Udaari
13. Peele Pattyaan di daastan
14. Hastaakhar
15. Pairchaal
16. Rin Pittraan da
17. Air Wair Mildayaan
18. Langh gaye dariya
19. Jimi Puchhay Asmaan
20. Katha Kuknoos Di
21. Duni Suhava Baagh
22. Katha Kaho Urvashi
23. Bhaujal
24. Oh taan pari si
25. Moh maaya
26. Janam Juye Haarya
27. Khada Pukare Pattani
28. Paunaan di jind meri
29. Khitij ton paar
30. Teen lok se nyari
31. Tumri katha kahi na jaye
32. Vichre Sabho Vaari Vaari
33. Takhat Hazara Door Kude

=== Stories ===
1. Merian saariyaan kahaniyaan
2. Kise da Munda
3. Saadhna
4. Yaatra Na Kro Corona hega
5. Ik kudi
6. Tera Kamra mera kamra
7. Panjaan Vich Prmeshar
8. Fullan Dian Kahaniyaan
9. Panchhiyaan Dian Kahaniyaan
10. Baabaniyaan Kahaniyaan
11. Putt Saputt Karen
12. Paidaan
13. Kaale Likh Na Lekh
14. Athhe Pehar
15. Rab Te Ruttan
16. Vedna (1958)
17. Yatra
18. Tera kamra mera kamra
19. Pira (1965)
20. Malan
21. Merian saariyan kahaniyaan (1995)
22. Bus conductor

=== Autobiography ===
1. Nange Pairaan da safar
2. Poochte ho to suno
3. Turdyaan Turdyaan

=== Essays ===
1. Tere mere sarokaar
2. Jeeun joge

=== English Translations ===
1. Such is her fate (Punjabi University)
2. A journey on bare feet (Orient Longman)
3. Twilight+Mark of the nosepin (NBT, Delhi)
4. Gone are the rivers (Macmillan)
5. The tale of the phoenix (Unistar, Chandigarh)
6. Who am I (Diamond Pocket Books, Delhi)
7. Tell the tale Urvashi (Orient Blackswan).

Who Am I? (trans. Dr. Rajinder Singh) Who am I is the story of a young and educated married woman, who feels suffocated in her monotonous life and chooses to renounce the world for self-realization. She follows a group of sadhus and sadhvis to Hardwar, but from there moves on alone in her quest for truth.

The characters in Tiwana's novels and short-stories are the downtrodden and the innocent rural folk with suppressed desires and passions. Tragedy and irony mark the main elements of her fiction. Complex inner duality of the female psyche is the chief theme of Tiwana. Besides her achievement in fiction, Tiwana has also written two books on literary criticism.

== Awards ==
Academic

- Honored with UGC National Lecturership.

Literary

- Govt. of Punjab Award for Sadhana as the best book of short stories, 1960–61.
- Woman of the year - American biographical institute, USA, 1955
- Sahitya Akademi Award in 1971 for novel Eho Hamara Jeevna (This our life, 1969)
- Ministry of Education and Social Welfare Award for Punjaan Vich Parmeshar in 1975
- Nanak Singh Puruskar (Languages Department, Govt. of Punjab) for the novel Peele Patian Di Dastan
- Gurmukh Singh Musafir Award (Languages Department, Govt. of Punjab) for the autobiography Nange Pairan Da Safar in 1982
- Canadian International Association of Punjabi Authors and Artists Award, 1985.
- Shiromani Sahitkar Award, Languages Department, Govt. of Punjab, 1987.
- Pramaan Pattar from Punjab Govt. 1989.
- Dhaliwal Award from Punjabi Sahit Academy, Ludhiana, 1991.
- Best Novelist of the Decade (1980–90), Punjabi Academy, Delhi, 1993.
- Nanjanagudu Thirumalamba Award for the novel Katha Kuknus Di, Karnataka, 1994
- Vagdevi Award for the novel Duni Suhava Bagh from Bhartiya Bhasha Parishad, Calcutta, 1998
- Honored with Mata Sahib Kaur Award during the tercentenary celebrations of the Birth of the Khalsa for outstanding contribution in the field of language, art and literature at Anandpur Sahib on 11 April 1999.
- Kartar Singh Dhaliwal Award (Lifetime achievement) from Punjabi Sahit Academy, Ludhiana, 2000
- Saraswati Samman in 2001 for novel Katha Kaho Urvashi
- Padma Shri Award in 2004 for Literature & Education
- Panj Pani Award from Jalandhar Doordarshan, 2005.
- Punjabi Sahit Rattan Award from Govt. of Punjab, 2008.
- Honorary D.Litt. from Guru Nanak Dev University, Amritsar, 2011.

== See also ==
- List of Punjabi authors
- List of Punjabi language poets
