= Bride buying in India =

Bride buying in India is the practice of forced arranged marriages through human trafficking. Brides are commonly referred to as "paro" (from the far side) or "molki" (one who has a price) within this framework. The brides are sold by their parents to human traffickers who transport and sell them within relatively wealthier regions of Northern India. The desire for a male child and subsequent female infanticide has resulted in a significantly lowered sex ratio within India, creating an abundance of unmarried men in Haryana, Punjab, Rajasthan, and Western UP. These men resort to purchasing inter-region women from impoverished communities mainly to continue their family lineage. The key motivation for low-income families to sell their daughter is to receive financial compensation and avoid having to pay a dowry. Major sources are the impoverished parts of Northeast India (Assam), Bihar, Jharkhand, Odisha, West Bengal, and Andhra Pradesh.

Progressive panchayats, khaps, and activists have been lobbying the government for the protection of the legal rights of molki brides by mandatory marriage registration and for the extension of government benefits of inter-caste marriages.

== Brides ==
Brides are usually women from impoverished areas, some reported to be as young as ten years old. Women are often motivated to escape undesirable economic situations. There have been reports of manipulation and abductions by traffickers who promise higher standards of living and wages in wealthier areas.

Women are sold at prices based on physical appearance such as health, age, beauty, and virginity. The prices range from 5,000 rupees ($70 USD) to 40,000 rupees ($550 USD). For the bride, marriage often means the end of their agency, freedom of movement, and access to education as traditional gender roles require maintenance of the marital home and caregiving of her in-laws. Due to the physical and mental underdevelopment of most brides, they are susceptible to serious health problems arising in pregnancy and childbirth; the leading cause of death among women aged 15–19 in India and other developing countries.

Despite undergoing traditional marriage rituals, trafficked brides struggle to be fully accepted in the community and regularly face discrimination due to the ambiguity regarding their marital status and are deprived of property rights.

Bride shortages have seen re-emergence of fraternal polyandry where one woman is shared with brother(s) of the husband. Karewa (widow remarriage) refers to the practice of marrying off the bride to the brother (or sometimes the father) of a deceased husband.

== Modus Operandi of Arranging Marriages ==
According to the research sponsored by the Royal Norwegian Embassy at Delhi, the Molki brides are arranged for marriage in 4 ways: Brides acting as marriage mediators, husbands of molki brides arranging brides for family and friends, marriage brokers also known as Dalals, and trafficking of women for forced marriages though this is not as prevalent. Molki brides face color discrimination, racism, slurs, social isolation, and related mental health issues. Among molki brides, cases of those who are trafficked are rarely reported and they find it difficult to obtain justice. Families of trafficked women often do not report it to the police because many people believe it to be the solution to the skewed sex ratio in India.

== Causes ==
=== Buying Brides ===
For the men of backward castes like Jats, Rors, Ahirs, and Yadavs there is a severe shortage of women. Rich men can easily find a local bride within their caste; however the disadvantaged men in these castes, who are mostly poor and do not own land, are the ones who must seek a bride using alternative methods. This phenomenon has now spread to lower castes and Indian Muslim communities.

In India, feticide, infanticide, and deliberate neglect of female children helped cause the sex ratio imbalance. Preference for a son stems from centuries-old patriarchal traditions which view women as financial burdens in a culture where property is passed down the male lineage and dowry expenses are expected to be paid by the bride's family. Despite the prevalence of the dowry system across all castes and regions in India, un-wealthy men who cannot find a bride are willing to pay for a bride from an improvised background.

=== Selling Daughters ===
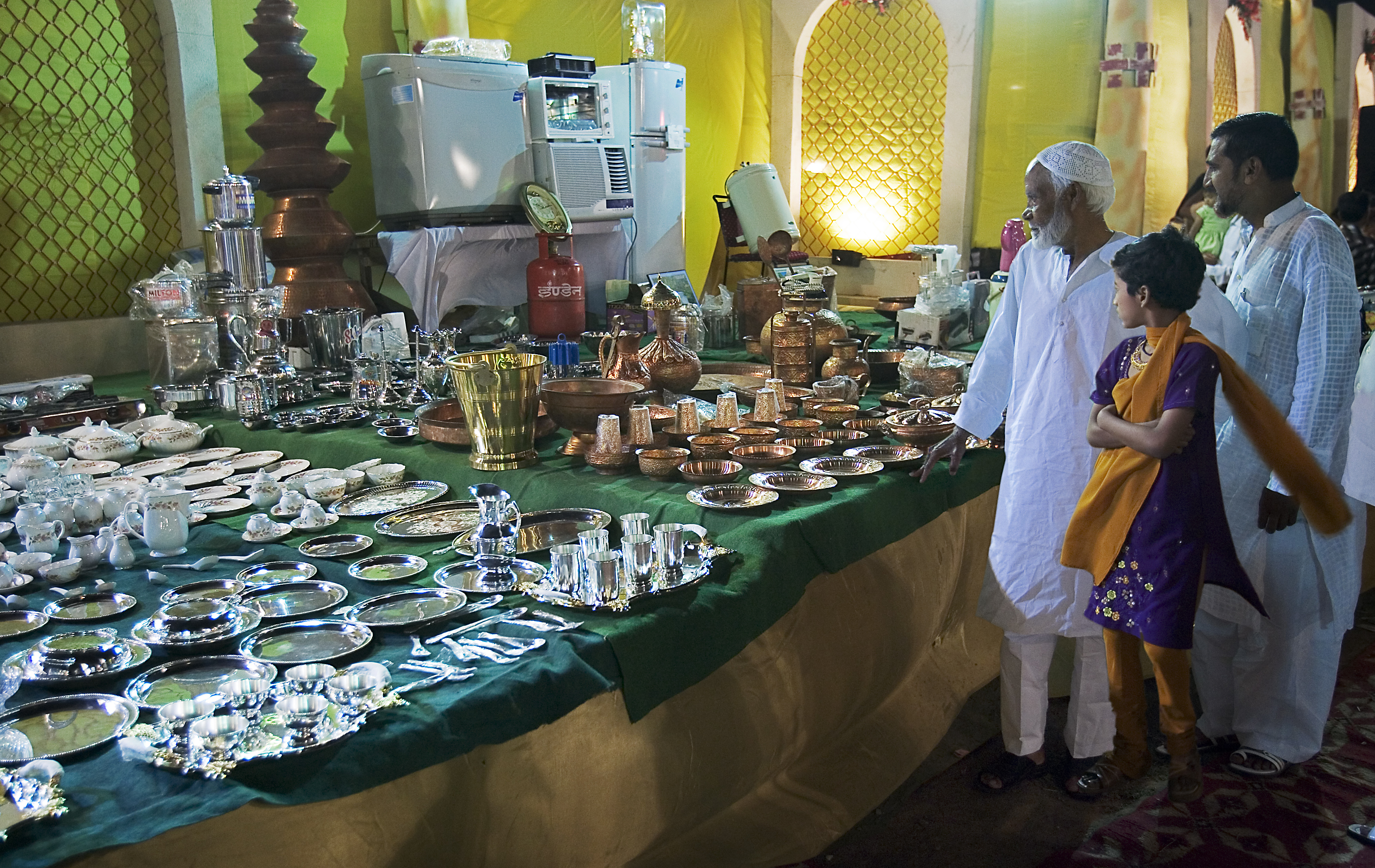
Wedding gifts for the son of the Imam of Delhi, India, with soldiers and 2000 guests

Impoverished families tend to be more vulnerable to selling their daughters for money, some of whom are led to believe their daughter is married to a wealthier man in a faraway place. Victim's families tend to be unaware that middleman resell their daughters to other states for a profit. Due to the dowry system in India, the bride's family gives durable goods, cash, and natural or movable property to the bridegroom, his parents, or his relatives as a condition of the marriage. Due to India's skewed inheritance laws, the Hindu Succession Act needed to be amended to stop the routine disinheritance of daughters.

== Domestic and International Laws ==
The Constitution of India prohibits all forms of trafficking under Article 23(1), which states that "Traffic in human beings and begar [sic] and other similar forms of forced labor are prohibited and any contravention of this provision shall be an offence punishable in accordance with the law." However, India has yet to implement comprehensive laws prohibiting the practice of bride trafficking. Despite explicit references to trafficking in the Immoral Traffic (Prevention) Act, 1956, it pertains only to commercial sexual activities in brothels and public places. The law conflates prostitution and forced sexual exploitation, but fails to distinguish between the victims and perpetrators of the crime.

While bride trafficking is not explicitly prohibited in Indian law, it does criminalize many aspects of the practice in statutes. The Child Marriage Restraint Act, 1929 provides the legal age of marriage is 21 for males and 18 for females. On 11 December 1992, India signed the UN Convention on the Rights of the Child subsequently passing the Juvenile Justice (Care and Protection of Children) Act, 2000, which was replaced by an act of the same name in 2015. The act protects children who have been sexually exploited or are at risk of sexual exploitation, but limits the definition of child as "a person who has not completed eighteen years of age." The act covers only some of the victims of sexual exploitation but it fails to account for those over the age of 18.

India is a member of human rights conventions which explicitly prohibit forced marriage, such as the Convention on the Elimination of All Forms of Discrimination Against Women 1979 (CEDAW) and the Convention on the Rights of the Child 1989 (CRC). The government of India passed domestic legislation in light of its international commitments such as the Prohibition of Child Marriage Act, 2006. Article 16(1)(b) of CEDAW states that women have "the same right freely to choose a spouse and to enter into marriage only with their free and full consent." By contrast, the CRC does not explicitly refer to child-marriage, but it does have numerous provisions that discuss such topics. These include article 19 which states that a child has "the right to protection from all forms of physical or mental violence, injury or abuse, maltreatment or exploitation, including sexual abuse, while in the care of parents, guardian or any other person", and article 34 which provides for "the right to protection from all forms of sexual exploitation and sexual abuse."

In the latest Concluding Observations on India (2014) the CEDAW recommended India amend the Immoral Traffic (Prevention) Act to include provisions that prevent trafficking of women, address the root causes of trafficking, ensure that traffickers are effectively investigated and prosecuted, and ensure victims of trafficking have access to victim support and witness protection.

== Source and destination states ==
=== Source states ===
The parents who sell their daughters as molki brides are usually from the lower socioeconomic strata of the under-developed or economically marginalized regions and states, such as Assam, Bihar, Jharkhand, Odisha, and West Bengal.

=== Destination states ===
The destination states are generally prosperous North Indian provinces where the sex ratio is more imbalanced. Some of the common destination states are Haryana, Punjab, Rajasthan, and Western Uttar Pradesh.

==== Haryana ====
A 2019 survey by Jind based Selfie-With-Daughter Foundation found 130,000 molki brides in Haryana. Among them, 1470 such brides "looted and scooted from their in-laws' house with valuables and expensive items," indicating a phenomenon of criminal gangs engaging in the organized practice. Molki bride practice, which started from the Ahirwal and Mewat region in the 1980s, is now common in Rohtak, Jind, Hisar, Kaithal, Yamunanagar, and Kurukshetra.

Haryana, one of the wealthiest states in India with the third-highest per capita income in 2014-2015 of 147,076 rupees (USD 2,293), is a destination state for the molki brides. An unintended consequence of Haryana's economic development is the advancement of medical technology and accessibility of its health care system which offer prenatal screening to determine the sex of the fetus. This has created a paradoxical situation where adverse sex ratio is perpetuated by parents routinely aborting female fetuses in favour of sons, contributing to the increase in demand for imported brides.

The Haryana government has taken several actions against female infanticide and gender discrimination, making them one of the most successful states in terms of improving sex ratio. According to the 2011 Census of India, there were 877 females to 1,000 males in Haryana against the national average of 933 females to 1000 males. In 2019, due to various initiatives by the Government of Haryana the sex ratio has improved to 920 females births per 1000 male child. This ratio saw an improvement in 2020, with SRB seeing a rise from 920 in 2019 to 922 in 2020. While the cumulative SRB dipped from 922 to 911 in the first half of 2021, showcasing a setback in the "Beti Bachao Beti Padhao" a flagship Programme, despite increase in raids and strict regulations on people practicing sex determination tests.

==== Rajasthan ====
Molki brides are often found in various districts of Rajasthan including Alwar and Jhunjhunu.

==== Uttar Pradesh ====
The practice has also been recorded in Western Uttar Pradesh which is a relatively affluent region of the state of Uttar Pradesh. Eastern Uttar Pradesh is one of the source of such brides.

== Critique ==
=== Disadvantages of molki system ===
According to the research of 10 source villages in Odisha as well as 1,216 molki brides in 226 villages in destination states of Haryana and Rajasthan, sponsored by the Royal Norwegian Embassy and titled "Tied in a Knot — cross-region marriages in Haryana and Rajasthan, Implications for Gender Rights and Gender Relations", the molki brides face color discrimination due to usually being darker, caste discrimination, names calling such as "molki" (one who was bought for money), slurs like "Biharan" a term "that implies poverty, desperation, filth and savagery", judgmental attitudes towards their parents who are seen as "thieves, sellers of daughters and primitive savages", leading to their social isolation and mental health issues.

=== Advantages of the molki system ===
Advantages include social stratification in terms of socioeconomically disadvantaged men are able to find brides who also are disadvantaged, bride's poor family also receives money, breaking of orthodox social taboos by making inter-caste and inter-religion marriages socially acceptable and widespread. Some orthodox khaps, which might usually oppose inter-caste marriages, generally provide a silent acceptance of the practice of molki brides by maintaining a "studied silence". Progressive panchayats and khaps have taken initiatives to champion the rights of molki brides by running campaign to make the marriage registration mandatory for these brides so that they and their children have the legal rights. Activists have been demanded that the government must extend the benefits of inter-caste marriages to molki marriages as well.

== Intervention against the bride trafficking ==
To address the nationwide issues of female infanticide, the government of India has passed the Pre-Conception and Pre-Natal Diagnostic Techniques Act 1994 which prohibits sex determination via prenatal screening. However, even if all discriminatory practices ceased it is estimated that it will take at least 50 years for the population to reach its natural sex ratio.

In 2002, the Union Ministry of Child and Development launched the Scheme for Women in Difficult Circumstances (SWADHAR) to protect the welfare of vulnerable women. The initiative aims to assist victims of exploitation to lead their life with dignity and conviction. SWADHAR has been implemented in Haryana since 2007.

=== Beti Bachao, Beti Padhao Yojana ("Educate Daughters, Save Daughters" scheme) ===
Beti Bachao, Beti Padhao Yojana (translation: Save the daughter, educate the daughter) is a campaign of the Government of India that aims to generate awareness and improve the efficiency of welfare services intended for girls. The scheme was launched with an initial funding of ₹100 crore (US$10 million). It mainly targets the clusters in Uttar Pradesh, Haryana, Uttarakhand, Punjab, Bihar and Delhi. Haryana is one of the most successful state in rapidly increasing sex ratio by taking stringent actions against female infanticide under this scheme.

Under the scheme, Haryana which had the sex ratio of 834 females in 2012, and improved the female ratio to 914 in 2018 resulting in 17 of 21 districts having a sex ratio of above 900 female to 1000 males and only 4 districts having a sex ratio of between 875 and 900. Some community development blocks have a newborn ratio of over 1000 females. For example: Ratia block, comprising 53 villages, had a yearly newborn ratio of 1003 females on 31 December 2018. This SRB ratio saw an improvement in 2020, with SRB seeing a rise from 920 in 2019 to 922 in 2020. While the cumulative SRB dipped from 922 to 911 in the first half of 2021, showcasing a setback in the "Beti Bachao Beti Padhao" a flagship Programme, despite increase in raids and strict regulations on people practicing sex determination tests.

=== Apni Beti, Apna Dhan Yojna ("Our Daughters, Our Wealth" scheme) ===
In response to the prevalence of child marriages in India, the government has implemented conditional cash transfer schemes which periodically pay families in exchange for delaying their daughters’ marriage until the age of 18. This initiative, known as Apni Beti Apna Dhan or "Our Daughters, Our Wealth", was launched in Haryana from 1994-1998 by the State Department of Women and Children Development. It offered 500 rupees ($8 USD) to families enrolled in the program, within 14 days of giving birth to a girl and a second payment of 25,000 rupees ($380 USD) on her 18th birthday provided she remained unmarried. Its goal was to delay marriage until the age of 18, as required by law, and in doing so it hoped to increase the value of girls in society and extend their education.

In 2012, as the first participants turned 18, a follow up assessment by International Centre for Research on Women showed that while enrolling in the program incentivized the parents to delay marrying off their daughters, financial incentives without other complementary interventions were inadequate to change the deeply entrenched gender roles and expectations on women.

=== Trafficking of Persons (Prevention, Protection and Rehabilitation) Bill 2016 ===
In June 2016, the Trafficking Persons (Prevention and Rehabilitation) Bill was published. It is envisioned as India's first comprehensive anti-trafficking law by consolidating all existing law on human trafficking. India's current legal framework lacks coordination between district and state agencies which has prevented effective prosecution of offenders. The bill focuses on three key aspects of tracking: prevention, protection and rehabilitation of victims. Despite this, the bill has been criticized for failing to provide a clear definition of trafficking and for its lack of clarity regarding rehabilitation measures.

A 2016 report by FXB Centre for Health and Human Rights at Harvard University into the Indian government's anti-trafficking initiatives revealed that the current approaches lack multi-faceted long-term commitment. They consist primarily of removal of victims from exploitative environments after which they are still exposed to the same structural vulnerabilities that led to their being trafficked originally, with the predictable outcome that many of them are re-trafficked.

== See also ==
- Arranged marriage in the Indian subcontinent
- Bride buying
- Child marriage in India
- Forced marriage
- Human rights in India
- Human trafficking in India
- Lavender marriage
- Mariage blanc
- Marriage of convenience
- Sham marriage
