= Legality of incest in the United States =

Laws regarding incest in the United States vary widely between jurisdictions regarding both the definition of the offense and penalties for its commission.

== Overview ==
In all but two states (and the special case of Ohio, which "targets only parental figures"), incest is criminalized between consenting adults. In New Jersey and Rhode Island, incest between consenting adults (16 or over for Rhode Island, 18 or over for New Jersey) is not a criminal offense, though marriage is not allowed in either state. New Jersey also increases the severity of underage sex offenses by a degree if they are also incestuous, and also criminalizes incest with 16-17 year olds (the normal age of consent in New Jersey is 16). Ohio allows incest between consenting adults only when one party is not a parental figure (see table below) to the other.

As of 2010, cases of incest involving consenting adults are often not revealed to outside parties, and therefore prosecutions of these cases do not frequently occur. Cases of parent-adult child incest exposed to law enforcement are usually uncovered by the other parent.

== Table ==
- The table below summarizes these laws for individual U.S. States and the District of Columbia.

Laws regarding incest in the United States : States : Federal district : Territories :
Jurisdiction	Prohibited relationships	Prohibited acts	Penalties
Alabama	Either legitimately or illegitimately: His ancestor or descendant by blood or adoption; or; His brother or sister of the whole or half-blood or by adoption; or; His stepchild or stepparent, while the marriage creating the relationship exists; or; His aunt, uncle, nephew or niece of the whole or half-blood.	Marriage, intercourse	A Class C felony, punishable by a prison term of "...not more than 10 years or less than 1 year and 1 day..." and a fine of up to $15,000.
Alaska	Either legitimately or illegitimately: an ancestor or descendant of the whole or half blood; or; a brother or sister of the whole or half blood; or; an uncle, aunt, nephew, or niece by blood.	Sexual penetration (being 18 years of age or older)	A Class C felony, punishable by a prison term "between 1 to 5 years" and up to a $50,000 fine.
American Samoa	A person he knows to be: his ancestor or descendant by blood or adoption; or; his stepchild or stepparent, while the marriage creating that relationship exists and while the stepchild is 18 years of age or less; or; his brother or sister of the whole or half-blood; or; his uncle, aunt, nephew, or niece of the whole blood.	Marriage, sexual intercourse, deviate sexual intercourse	A Class D felony, punishable by a prison term "not to exceed 5 years" and up to a $5,000 fine.
Arizona	Persons with degrees of consanguinity which makes marriage incestuous and void. These are: between parents and children, including grandparents and grandchildren of every degree; between brothers and sisters of the one-half as well as the whole blood, and; between uncles and nieces, aunts and nephews and between first cousins; Exception: first cousins may marry if both are 65 years of age or older, and can prove to a superior court judge in the state that one of the cousins is unable to reproduce.	Marriage, intercourse (cited in state law as fornication), or adultery	A class 4 felony, with an imprisonment term ranging between 1 and 3 and three-quarter years, depending on the severity.
Arkansas	The person committing the act being at least 16 years of age, knowingly, and without regard to legitimacy, including blood relationships: An ancestor or a descendant; A stepchild or adopted child; A brother or sister of the whole or half blood; An uncle, aunt, nephew, or niece; or; A stepgrandchild or adopted grandchild.	Marriage, sexual intercourse, or deviate sexual activity with a prohibited person.	A Class C felony punishable by imprisonment from 3 to 10 years for the first offense and a fine of up to $10,000.
California	Being 14 years of age or older^{α}, persons within degrees of consanguinity which make marriages incestuous and void, without regard to the legitimacy of the relationship. These are: Parents and children; Ancestors and descendants of every degree; Siblings of the half or whole blood; Uncles or aunts & nieces or nephews	Marriage, sexual intercourse (cited in state law as fornication) or adultery	"...imprisonment in the state prison" (specific penalty not described by state law) Registration as a sex offender (for life until January 1, 2021; at least 20 years from date of conviction [if only serving probation] or date of release as of January 1, 2021)
Colorado	Ancestor or descendant, including a natural child, child by adoption, or stepchild, a brother or sister of the whole or half blood, or an uncle, aunt, nephew, or niece of the whole blood ("descendant" includes a child by adoption and a stepchild, but only if the person is not legally married to the child by adoption or the stepchild).	Marriage, sexual penetration, sexual intrusion, sexual contact	Incest: 2y to 6y and $2,000 (minimum) to $500,000 fine; Aggravated incest: 4y to 12 y and $3,000 (minimum) to $750,000 fine. A conviction for incest or aggravated incest will also result in a sentence of lifetime supervision, which means electronic tagging for life, under the Lifetime Supervision of Sex Offenders Act 1998, which also applies to incest, under Part 10 of Title 18 of the Colorado Revised Statutes.
Connecticut	Any person related within degrees specified in 46b-21; No person may marry such person's parent, grandparent, child, grandchild, sibling, parent's sibling, sibling's child, stepparent or stepchild. "a person is guilty of sexual assault in the third degree when such person engages in sexual intercourse with another person whom the actor knows to be related to him or her within any of the degrees of kindred specified in the statute that specifies which relatives are prohibited from marrying one another."	Marriage; sexual intercourse	1y to 5y and $5,000 fine
Delaware	Without regard to legitimacy or adoption, a person and their child, a person and their parent, a person and their sibling, a person and their grandchild, a person and their niece or nephew, a person and their parent's siblings, a male and his father's wife, a male and his wife's child, a male and his wife's grandchild, a female and her mother's husband, a female and her husband's grandchild, a female and her husband's child.	Sexual intercourse	Up to 1y and $2,300 fine
District of Columbia	Any person related to another person (not including the 4th degree of consanguinity); marriage void if between a person and the person’s grandparent, grandparent’s spouse, spouse’s grandparent, parent’s sibling, parent, step-parent, spouse’s parent, child, spouse’s child, child’s spouse, sibling, child’s child, child’s child’s spouse, spouse’s child’s child, sibling’s child.	Marriage, cohabitation, sexual intercourse	Up to 12y and $37,500 fine
Florida	Any person related by lineal consanguinity, or a brother, sister, uncle, aunt, nephew, or niece	Marriage, sexual intercourse (defined as the penetration of the female sex organ by the male sex organ, however slight; emission of semen is not required).	Up to 5y (up to 15y in some cases) and $5,000 fine
Georgia	Person known to be (by blood or marriage): (1) Father and child or stepchild; (2) Mother and child or stepchild; (3) Siblings of the whole blood or of the half blood or by virtue of adoption; (4) Grandparent and grandchild of the whole blood or of the half blood or by virtue of adoption; (5) Aunt and niece or nephew of the whole blood or of the half blood or by virtue of adoption; or (6) Uncle and niece or nephew of the whole blood or of the half blood or by virtue of adoption.	Sexual intercourse	10y to 30y
Hawaii	Persons within degrees of consanguinity or affinity within which marriage is prohibited.	Sexual penetration	Up to 5y
Idaho	Parents and children, ancestors and descendants of every degree, and between brothers and sisters of the half (1/2) as well as the whole blood, and between uncles and nieces, or aunts and nephews, are incestuous, and void from the beginning, whether the relationship is legitimate or illegitimate.	Marriage, sexual intercourse, adultery	Up to 15y. In the case the victim is under 18 years of age, up to life imprisonment
Illinois	Person related to other person as a (i) Brother or sister, either of the whole blood or the half blood; or (ii) Father or mother, when the child, regardless of legitimacy and regardless of whether the child was of the whole blood or half-blood or was adopted, was 18 years of age or over when the act was committed; or (iii) Stepfather or stepmother, when the stepchild was 18 years of age or over when the act was committed .	Sexual penetration	2y to 10y and $25,000 fine (more if specified)
Indiana	Person known to be biological parent, child, grandparent, grandchild, sibling, aunt, uncle, niece, or nephew.	Sexual intercourse, deviate sexual conduct, marriage (unless valid where entered)	1y to 6y (advisory)
Iowa	Legitimately or illegitimately: Person knows to be ancestor, descendant, brother or sister of whole or half blood, aunt, uncle, niece or nephew.	Sexual act	Up to 5y and $7,500 fine
Guam	An ancestor or descendant, a brother or sister of the whole or half blood or an uncle, aunt, nephew or niece of the whole blood.	Knowing marriage or cohabitation	Up to 1y
Kansas	Person known to be biologically related as parent, child, grandparent of any degree, grandchild of any degree, brother, sister, half-brother, half-sister, uncle, aunt, nephew, niece.	Marriage, sexual intercourse, sodomy	5m-13m (simple), 31m-136m (aggravated) and/or up to $100,000 fine for either simple or aggravated.
Kentucky	Known ancestor, descendant, brother, or sister without regard to legitimacy, adoption, whole or half blood, or stepparent and stepchild.	Sexual intercourse or deviate sexual intercourse	No 5y to life imprisonment
Louisiana	Ascendant or descendant, brother or sister, uncle or niece, aunt or nephew (with knowledge), related by consanguinity either whole or half blood	Marriage (unless married legally in another state) or sexual intercourse.	5y to 30y
Maine	Persons known to be within the 2nd degree of consanguinity (woman and her father, grandfather, son, grandson, brother, brother's son, sister's son, father's brother or mother's brother; man and his mother, grandmother, daughter, granddaughter, sister, brother's daughter, sister's daughter, father's sister or mother's sister).	Sexual intercourse (any penetration of the female sex organ by the male sex organ)	Up to 5y and/or $5000 fine
Maryland	Persons who may not marry, within 3 degrees of lineal consanguinity or 1 degree of collateral consanguinity (an individual's grandparent, parent, child, sibling, grandchild, grandparent's spouse, spouse's grandparent, parent's sibling, stepparent, spouse's parent, spouse's child, child's spouse, grandchild's spouse, spouse's grandchild, or sibling's child).	Vaginal intercourse	1y to 10y
Massachusetts	Persons within degrees of consanguinity which make marriages incestuous and void: Marriages between parents and children, ancestors and descendants of every degree, and between brothers and sisters of the half (1/2) as well as the whole blood, and between uncles and nieces, or aunts and nephews, are incestuous, and void from the beginning, whether the relationship is legitimate or illegitimate.	Marriage, sexual intercourse, sexual activities (including but not limited to, oral or anal intercourse, fellatio, cunnilingus, or other penetration of a part of a person's body, or insertion of an object into the genital or anal opening of another person's body, or the manual manipulation of the genitalia of another person's body)	Up to 20y
Michigan	Criminal sexual conduct in the 4th degree includes when the actors are related "by blood or affinity to the third degree."	Sexual contact	Up to 2y or a fine of up to $500 or both
Minnesota	Person "nearer of kin to the actor than first cousin…whether of the half or the whole blood, with knowledge of the relationship".	Sexual intercourse	Up to 10y
Mississippi	Person within degrees of consanguinity which make marriages incestuous and void due to blood.	Marriage or cohabitation, adultery or sexual intercourse	Up to 10y or $500 fine
Missouri	Persons known to be ancestor or descendant by blood or adoption; stepchild while the marriage creating the relationship exists; brother or sister of whole or half blood; or uncle, aunt, nephew, or niece of the whole blood.	Marriage, cohabitation, sexual intercourse, sexual contact	Up to 7y
Montana	Person known to an ancestor, a descendant, a brother or sister of the whole or half-blood, or a stepson or step-daughter, without regard to legitimacy, adoption, or step- relationship.	Marriage, cohabitation, sexual intercourse, sexual contact	No Up to life imprisonment or up to $50,000 fine
Nebraska	Between parents and children, grandparents and grandchildren of every degree, between brothers and sisters of the half as well as the whole blood, and between uncles and nieces, aunts and nephews. Extend to children and relations born out of wedlock or any person who sexually penetrates a minor stepchild.	Marriage, sexual penetration	1y to 25y
Nevada	Persons within degrees of consanguinity which make marriages incestuous and void: not nearer of kin than second cousins or cousins of the half blood	Marriage, fornication, adultery	No 2y to life imprisonment and $10,000 fine
New Hampshire	Person know to be an ancestor, descendant, brother or sister (whole or half blood), and uncle, aunt, nephew, or niece without regard to legitimacy, stepchildren, and relationships of parent and child by adoption.	Marriage, cohabitation (under the representation of marriage), sexual intercourse	10y to 20y
New Jersey	When the actor is "related to the victim by blood or affinity to the 3rd degree" and the victim is at least 16 but less than 18 years old. Underage sexual offences are increased in severity by a degree if also incestuous. When the actor has "a legal duty for the care of a child or who has assumed responsibility for the care of a child who engages in sexual conduct which would impair or debauch the morals of the child is guilty of a crime of the second degree", child in this section being defined as less than 18 years old. Consensual incest between people 18 years old or more is not a criminal offense.	Sexual penetration (2nd degree sexual assault) or sexual contact (4th degree criminal sexual contact). See Prohibited Relationships.	At least 15y without parole (2nd degree sexual assault) or up to 18m (4th degree criminal sexual contact)
New Mexico	Persons known to be parents and children (including grandparents and grandchildren of every degree), brothers and sisters of half and whole blood, uncles and nieces, aunts and nephews.	Marriage or sexual intercourse	Up to 3y and $5,000 fine
New York	Persons known to be related to him or her, whether through marriage or not, as an ancestor, descendant, brother or sister of either the whole or the half blood, uncle, aunt, nephew or niece. Half-blood uncle/niece marriages are valid pursuant to a 2014 State Court decision. See https://www.courthousenews.com/half-blood-uncle-niece-couples-endorsed-in-ny/	Marriage, sexual intercourse, oral sexual conduct, or anal sexual conduct	10y to 25y
North Carolina	Person that is grandparent or grandchild; parent or child or stepchild or adopted child; brother or sister of whole or half-blood; uncle aunt, nephew or niece.	Carnal intercourse	10m to 182m
North Dakota	Persons known to be within a degree of consanguinity which makes marriages void between: parents and children, including grandparents and grandchildren of every degree; brothers and sisters of the half as well as the whole blood; uncles and nieces of the half as well as the whole blood; aunts and nephews of the half as well as the whole blood; first cousins of the half as well as the whole blood (illegitimate and legitimate children and relatives).	Marriage, cohabitation, sexual activity	Up to 5y and $10,000 fine
Northern Mariana Islands	A person who is related either legitimately or illegitimately, as (1) an ancestor or descendant of the whole or half blood; (2) a brother or sister of the whole or half blood; or (3) an uncle, aunt, nephew, or niece by blood	A person 18 years of age or older engages in sexual penetration	Up to 5y and $2,000 fine
Ohio	Actor is the victim's "natural or adoptive parent, step-parent guardian, custodian, or person in loco parentis of the other person".	Sexual conduct	2y to 8y
Oklahoma	Persons within degrees of consanguinity which make a marriage incestuous and void.	Marriage, fornication, adultery	Up to 10y
Oregon	Persons known to be related, legitimately or otherwise as Ancestors, descendants, or brother or sister of whole or half blood.	Marriage, sexual intercourse, deviate sexual intercourse	Up to 20y and $375,000 fine
Pennsylvania	Ancestor or descendant, a brother or sister of whole or half-blood, or an uncle, aunt, nephew, or niece of whole blood (blood relationships without regard to legitimacy, and relationship of parent and child by adoption).	Marriage, cohabitation, sexual intercourse	Up to 10y
Puerto Rico	Persons who have a relationship of kinship, by being ascendant or descendant, by consanguinity, adoption or affinity, or collateral by consanguinity or adoption, until the third degree, or by sharing or possessing physical custody or parental authority.	Sexual intercourse.	50y (8y if the party promoting the conduct is a minor who has not turned 18 if prosecuted as an adult.)
Rhode Island	No person shall marry his or her sibling, parent, grandparent, child, grandchild, stepparent, grandparents' spouse, spouse's child, spouse's grandchild, sibling's child or parent's sibling. Consensual incest between people 16 years old or more is not a criminal offense.	Marriage	None
South Carolina	(1) A man with his mother, grandmother, daughter, granddaughter, stepmother, sister, grandfather's wife, son's wife, grandson's wife, wife's mother, wife's grandmother, wife's daughter, wife's granddaughter, brother's daughter, sister's daughter, father's sister or mother's sister; (2) A woman with her father, grandfather, son, grandson, stepfather, brother, grandmother's husband, daughter's husband, granddaughter's husband, husband's father, husband's grandfather, husband's son, husband's grandson, brother's son, sister's son, father's brother or mother's brother.	Carnal intercourse	6m to 5y and $500 minimum fine
South Dakota	Marriages between parents and children, ancestors and descendants of every degree, and between brothers and sisters of the half as well as the whole blood, and between uncles and nieces, or aunts and nephews, and between cousins of the half as well as of the whole blood, are null and void from the beginning, whether the relationship is legitimate or illegitimate and include such relationships that arise through adoption.	Mutually consensual sexual penetration	Up to 15y and $30,000 fine
Tennessee	Any person known to be natural parent, child, grandparent, grandchild, uncle, aunt, nephew, niece, stepparent, stepchild, adoptive parent, adoptive child or brother and sister of the half or whole blood.	Sexual penetration	3y to 15y and up to $10,000 fine
Texas	Person known to be ancestor or descendant by blood or adoption; current or former stepchild or stepparent; parent's brother or sister of the whole or half blood; brother or sister of the whole or half blood or by adoption; children of the actor's brother or sister of the whole or half blood or by adoption; the son or daughter of the actor's aunt or uncle of the whole or half blood or by adoption.	Sexual intercourse (any penetration of the female sex organ by the male sex organ), deviate sexual intercourse (any contact between the genitals of one person and the mouth or anus of another person with intent to arouse or gratify the sexual desire of any person)	2y to 20y and up to $10,000 fine
United States Virgin Islands	INCEST: Persons being within the degrees of consanguinity within which marriages are declared by law to be void (V.I. CODE ANN. TIT. 14, § 961); VOID MARRIAGES: (a) A marriage is prohibited and void from the beginning, without being so decreed and its nullity may be shown in any collateral proceeding, when it is between- (1) a man and his grandmother, grandfather's wife, wife's grandmother, father's sister, mother's sister, mother, stepmother, wife's mother, daughter, wife's daughter, son's wife, sister, son's daughter, daughter's daughter, son's son's wife, daughter's son's wife, wife's son's daughter, wife's daughter's daughter, brother's daughter or sister's daughter; (2) a woman and her grandfather, grandmother's husband, husband's grandfather, father's brother, mother's brother, father, stepfather, husband's father, son, husband's son, daughter's husband, brother, son's son, daughter's son, son 's daughter's husband, daughter's daughter's husband, husband's son's son, husband's daughter's son, brother's son or sister's son; or (3) any persons either of whom has been previously married and whose previous marriage has not been terminated by death or a decree of divorce. (b) Any of such marriages may also be declared to have been null and void by judicial decree. (V.I. CODE ANN. TIT. 16, § 1)	who knowingly intermarry with each other, or who commit fornication or adultery with each other	shall each be imprisoned for not more than 10 years.
Utah	Person known to be ancestor, descendant, brother, sister, uncle, aunt, nephew, niece, or first cousin, without regard to whole or half blood relationship, legitimacy, parent and child by adoption, or relationship of stepparent and stepchild while the marriage creating the relationship of a stepparent and stepchild exists.	Sexual intercourse (not amounting to rape, rape of a child or aggravated sexual assault)	Up to 5y and $5,000 fine
Vermont	Persons for whom marriage are prohibited by state law.	Marriage, fornication	Up to 5y and $1,000 fine
Virginia	Persons for whom marriages are prohibited; relations with children and grandchildren.	Adultery or fornication	1y to 10y and up to $2,500 fine (18 years of age or older); 5y to 20y and up to $100,000 fine (under 18 years of age)
Washington	Persons known to be related to him or her, either legitimately or illegitimately, as an ancestor, descendant, brother, or sister of either the whole or the half blood.	1st degree incest: sexual intercourse; 2nd degree incest: Sexual contact	1st degree incest: up to 10y and up to $20,000 fine; 2nd degree incest: up to 5y and up to $10,000 fine;
West Virginia	Engaging with his or her father, mother, brother, sister, daughter, son, grandfather, grandmother, grandson, granddaughter, nephew, niece, uncle or aunt. The definition of parent and child includes adoptive and step.	Sexual intercourse (any act between persons involving penetration, however slight, of the female sex organ by the male sex organ or involving contact between the sex organs of one person and the mouth or anus of another person) or sexual intrusion (any act between persons involving penetration, however slight, of the female sex organ or of the anus of any person by an object for the purpose of degrading or humiliating the person so penetrated or for gratifying the sexual desire of either party)	5y to 15y and $500 to $5,000 fine
Wisconsin	Persons known to be blood relatives and such relative is in fact related in a degree within the marriage is prohibited by the law	Marriage or nonmarital sexual intercourse.	Up to 40y and $100,000 fine
Wyoming	Persons known to be an ancestor or descendant or a brother or sister of the whole or half blood, including relationships of parent and child by adoption, blood relationships without regard to legitimacy, stepparent and stepchild.	Sexual intrusion, sexual contact	Up to 15y and $10,000 fine

== Notes ==
^α According to a California Supreme Court case, being under the age of 18 in a consensual incestual relationship with an adult causes the minor to be a victim of the crime of incest, not an accomplice to the crime itself. See People v. Tobias (2001) 25 Cal.4th 327 However, this does not include a minor 14 years of age or older as the law was amended by the Legislature to partially overturn the ruling. See Stats. 2005, Ch. 477, Sec. 1. (SB 33).

== See also ==
- Affinity (Catholic canon law)
- Assortative mating
- Avunculate marriage
- Coefficient of relationship
- Consanguine marriage
- Cousin marriage in the Middle East
- Cousin marriage law in the United States
- Endogamy
- Genetic distance
- Genetic diversity
- Genetic sexual attraction
- Inbreeding
- Inbreeding avoidance
- Inbreeding depression
- Incest taboo
- Jetyata
- Jewish views on incest
- Legality of incest
- List of coupled cousins
- Mahram
- Pedigree collapse
- Proximity of blood
- Sibling marriage
- Watta satta
- Westermarck effect
