= Relationship =

Relationship most often refers to:

- Family relations and relatives
  - Consanguinity
- Interpersonal relationship, a strong, deep, or close association or acquaintance between two or more people
  - Intimate relationship, close relationship that may involve feelings of romance or love and sexual intimacy
- Correlation and dependence, relationships in mathematics and statistics between two variables or sets of data
- Semantic relationship, an ontology component
- Romance (love), a connection between two people driven by love and/or sexual attraction

Relationship or Relationships may also refer to:

== Arts and media ==
- "Relationship" (song), by Young Thug featuring Future
- "Relationships" (As Time Goes By), an episode of the British TV series As Time Goes By
- The Relationship, an American rock band
  - The Relationship (album), their 2010 album
- The Relationships, an English band who played at the 2009 Truck Festival
- Relationships (album), a 1994 album by BeBe & CeCe Winans
- Relationships, a 2001 album by Georgie Fame
- "Relationship", a song by Lakeside on the 1987 album Power

== Other uses ==
- Relationship (archaeology), the position in space of an object with respect to another

== See also ==
- Affinity (disambiguation)
- Entity–relationship model
- Relation (disambiguation)
