= Relation =

Relation or relations may refer to:

== General uses ==
- International relations, the study of interconnection of politics, economics, and law on a global level
- Interpersonal relationship, association or acquaintance between two or more people
- Public relations, managing the spread of information to the public
- Sexual relations, or human sexual activity
- Social relation, in social science, any social interaction between two or more individuals

== Logic and philosophy ==
- Relation (philosophy), links between properties of an object
- Relational theory, framework to understand reality or a physical system

== Mathematics ==
A finitary or n-ary relation is a set of n-tuples. Specific types of relations include:

- Relation (mathematics) (an elementary treatment of binary relations)
- Binary relation (or diadic relation – a more in-depth treatment of binary relations)
- Equivalence relation
- Homogeneous relation
- Reflexive relation
- Serial relation
- Ternary relation (or triadic, 3-adic, 3-ary relation)

Relation may also refer to:

- Directed relation
- Relation algebra, an algebraic structure inspired by algebraic logic

== Databases and ontology ==
- Relational model, an approach to managing data
  - Relation (database), a component of a relational database
  - Relational algebra
  - Relational calculus
  - Relational database, a digital database
- Relationships (also known as relations), one of the ontology components

== Art and literature ==
- Relation aller Fürnemmen und gedenckwürdigen Historien, the first newspaper
- Relation (film), a 1982 Japanese experimental short film by Toshio Matsumoto
- Relations (album), a 2004 album of cover versions by Kathryn Williams

== Linguistics ==
- Grammatical relation, a functional relationship between constituents in a clause.

== See also ==
- Relate (disambiguation)
- Relationism (disambiguation)
- Relationship (disambiguation)
  - Kinship, in anthropology and generally, the web of human social relationships, or an affinity between entities because of some characteristics
  - Coefficient of relationship in biology
- Relative (disambiguation)
- Relativism
- Relativity (disambiguation)
