= Affine =

Affine may describe any of various topics concerned with connections or affinities. It is used in mathematics and applications with an unrelated meaning.
It may refer to:

- Affine, a relative by marriage in law and anthropology

== Mathematics ==
In mathematics, affine is usually used to qualify topics where linear expressions may have constant terms and generalizations of such topics.

- Affine combination, a certain kind of constrained linear combination
- Affine connection, a connection on the tangent bundle of a differentiable manifold
- Affine coordinate system, a coordinate system that can be viewed as a Cartesian coordinate system where the axes have been placed so that they are not necessarily orthogonal to each other.
- Affine differential geometry, a geometry that studies differential invariants under the action of the special affine group
- Affine geometry, a geometry characterized by parallel lines
- Affine group, the group of all invertible affine transformations from any affine space over a field K into itself
- Affine logic, a substructural logic whose proof theory rejects the structural rule of contraction
- Affine representation, a continuous group homomorphism whose values are automorphisms of an affine space
- Affine scheme, the spectrum of prime ideals of a commutative ring
  - Affine morphism, a morphism of schemes such that the pre-image of an open affine subscheme is affine
- Affine space, an abstract structure that generalises the affine-geometric properties of Euclidean space
- Affine transformation, a transformation that preserves the relation of parallelism between lines

== Mathematics applications ==
- Affine cipher, a special case of the more general substitution cipher
- Affine gap penalty, the most widely used scoring function used for sequence alignment, especially in bioinformatics

== See also ==
- Affinity (disambiguation)
