= Relate (disambiguation) =

Relate is a British charity providing relationship support.

Relate may also refer to:

- "Relate" (song), a 2021 song by For King & Country
- Relate, a 2013 album by Neon Highwire
- Relate Institute, a department of Doncaster College, South Yorkshire, England

== See also ==
- Relative (disambiguation)
- Relation (disambiguation)
