= Relationism =

Relationism may refer to:

- Relational theory, in physics
- Relationism (Mannheim), a concept in the sociology of knowledge developed by Karl Mannheim

== See also ==
- Relation (disambiguation)
- Relativity (disambiguation)
