= Affinity =

Affinity may refer to:

== Commerce, finance and law ==
- Affinity (law), kinship by marriage
- Affinity analysis, a market research and business management technique
- Affinity Credit Union, a Saskatchewan-based credit union
- Affinity Equity Partners, an Asian private equity firm
- Affinity fraud, a type of scam targeting a specific demographic
- Affinity marketing, a method of extending market reach by forming partnerships and cross-selling relationships
- Affinity Partners, an American private equity firm

== Religion and belief ==
- Affinity (canon law), a kinship arising from the sexual intercourse of a man and a woman
- Affinity (Christian organisation), network of conservative evangelical churches and Christian agencies
- Affinity group, a private, non-commercial and non-governmental organisation formed around a shared affinity, interest or goal

== Science and technology ==
- Affinity, the UK's first road-legal solar car, built by Cambridge University Eco Racing
- Affinity (mathematics), an affine transformation preserving collinearity
- Affinity (pharmacology), a characterisation of protein-ligand binding strength
- Affinity (sociology), a shared interest and commitment between persons in groups and/or willingness to associate
- Affinity (taxonomy), a suggestion of common descent or type
- Affinity chromatography, method of separating a biomolecule from a mixture
- Affinity electrophoresis, general name for many analytical methods used in biochemistry and biotechnology
- Affinity laws, laws used in hydraulics to express relationships between variables involved in fan or pump performance
- Binding affinity, a measure of the interaction of ligands with their binding sites
- Chemical affinity, used to describe or characterise elements' or compounds' readiness to form bonds
- Electron affinity, energy released on formation of anions
- Processor affinity, a computing term for the assignment of a task to a given core of a multicore CPU
- Serif Europe/Canva's Affinity series of programs:
  - Affinity (software), an all-in-one graphics editor
  - Affinity Designer, a discontinued vector graphics editor
  - Affinity Photo, a discontinued raster graphics editor
  - Affinity Publisher, a discontinued desktop publishing application

== Media-related ==
=== Music ===
- Affinity (band), a jazz/rock band
  - Affinity (Affinity album)
- Affinity (Bill Evans album)
- Affinity (Haken album)
- Affinity (Oscar Peterson album)
- Affinity (EP), a 2013 EP by the English band Press to Meco
- Johnny Alegre Affinity, a jazz collective based in Manila

=== Other media ===
- Affinity (novel), a 1999 novel by Sarah Waters
  - Affinity (film), a 2008 feature film based on the novel
- "Affinity" (Stargate SG-1), an episode from season 8 of the TV sci-fi spin-off series Stargate SG-1

== Other uses ==
- Affinity (medieval), late medieval retainers of a monarch in "bastard feudalism"
- Affinity, West Virginia

== See also ==
- Affine (disambiguation)
  - Affine transformation, a type of transformation applied to a geometry
  - Refining, also known as "affining"
- Afinidad (disambiguation)
