= Symbol =

Something that represents an idea, process, or physical entity

A red octagon symbolizes "stop" even without the word.

Wearing variously colored ribbons is a symbolic action that shows support for certain campaigns.

A symbol is a mark, sign, or word that indicates, signifies, or is understood as representing an idea, object, relationship, or mathematical formula. Symbols allow people to go beyond what is known or seen by creating linkages between otherwise different concepts and experiences. All communication is achieved through the use of symbols: for example, a red octagon is a common symbol for "STOP"; on maps, blue lines often represent rivers; and a red rose often symbolizes love and compassion. Numerals are symbols for numbers; letters of an alphabet may be symbols for certain phonemes; and personal names are symbols representing individuals. The academic study of symbols is called semiotics.

In the arts, symbolism is the use of a concrete element to represent a more abstract idea. In cartography, an organized collection of symbols forms a legend for a map.

== Etymology ==
The word symbol derives from the late Middle French masculine noun symbole, which appeared around 1380 in a theological sense signifying a formula used in the Roman Catholic Church as a sort of synonym for 'the credo'; by extension in the early Renaissance it came to mean 'a maxim' or 'the external sign of a sacrament'; these meanings were lost in secular contexts. It was during the Renaissance in the mid-16th century that the word took on the meaning that is dominant today, that of 'a natural fact or object evoking by its form or its nature an association of ideas with something abstract or absent'; this appears, for example, in François Rabelais, Le Quart Livre, in 1552. This French word derives from Latin, where both the masculine noun symbolus and the neuter noun symbolum refer to "a mark or sign as a means of recognition." The Latin word derives from Ancient Greek: σύμβολον symbolon, from a verb meaning 'put together', 'compare', alluding to the Classical practice of breaking a piece of ceramic in two and giving one half to the person who would receive a future message, and one half to the person who would send it: when the two fit perfectly together, the receiver could be sure that the messenger bearing it did indeed also carry a genuine message from the intended person. A literary or artistic symbol as an "outward sign" of something else is a metaphorical extension of this notion of a message from a sender to a recipient. In English, the meaning "something which stands for something else" was first recorded in 1590, in Edmund Spenser's Faerie Queene.

== Concepts and definitions ==
Symbols are a means of complex communication that often can have multiple levels of meaning. Symbols are the basis of all human understanding and serve as vehicles of conception for all human knowledge. Symbols facilitate understanding of the world in which we live, thus serving as the grounds upon which we make judgments. In this way, people use symbols not only to make sense of the world around them but also to identify and cooperate in society through constitutive rhetoric.

Human cultures use symbols to express specific ideologies and social structures and to represent aspects of their specific culture. Thus, symbols carry meanings that depend upon one's cultural background. As a result, the meaning of a symbol is not inherent in the symbol itself but is culturally learned.

Heinrich Zimmer gives a concise overview of the nature, and perennial relevance, of symbols.

Concepts and words are symbols, just as visions, rituals, and images are; so too are the manners and customs of daily life. Through all of these, a transcendent reality is mirrored. There are so many metaphors reflecting and implying something which, though thus variously expressed, is ineffable, though thus rendered multiform, remains inscrutable. Symbols hold the mind to truth but are not themselves the truth, hence it is delusory to borrow them. Each civilisation, every age, must bring forth its own."

In the book Signs and Symbols, it is stated that

A symbol ... is a visual image or sign representing an idea – a deeper indicator of universal truth.

== Symbols and semiotics ==
Semiotics is the study of signs, symbols, and signification as communicative behavior. Semiotics studies focus on the relationship of the signifier and the signified, also taking into account the interpretation of visual cues, body language, sound, and other contextual clues. Semiotics is linked with linguistics and psychology. Semioticians not only study what a symbol implies but also how it got its meaning and how it functions to make meaning in society. For example, symbols can cause confusion in translation when the same symbol means different things in the source and target languages. A potential error documented in survey translation is the symbol of "x" used to denote "yes" when marking a response in the English language surveys, but "x" usually means "no" in the Chinese convention. Symbols allow the human brain continuously to create meaning using sensory input and decode symbols through both denotation and connotation.

== Formal symbols ==
This diagram shows the syntactic entities that may be constructed from formal languages. The symbols and strings of symbols may be broadly divided into nonsense and well-formed formulas. A formal language can be thought of as identical to the set of its well-formed formulas. The set of well-formed formulas may be broadly divided into theorems and non-theorems.

In mathematics, a symbol is a glyph or a group of glyphs that is used in mathematical notation. In mathematical logic, a symbol is, more specifically, an element of the alphabet used for writing formulas of a formal system.

=== Terminal and nonterminal symbols ===
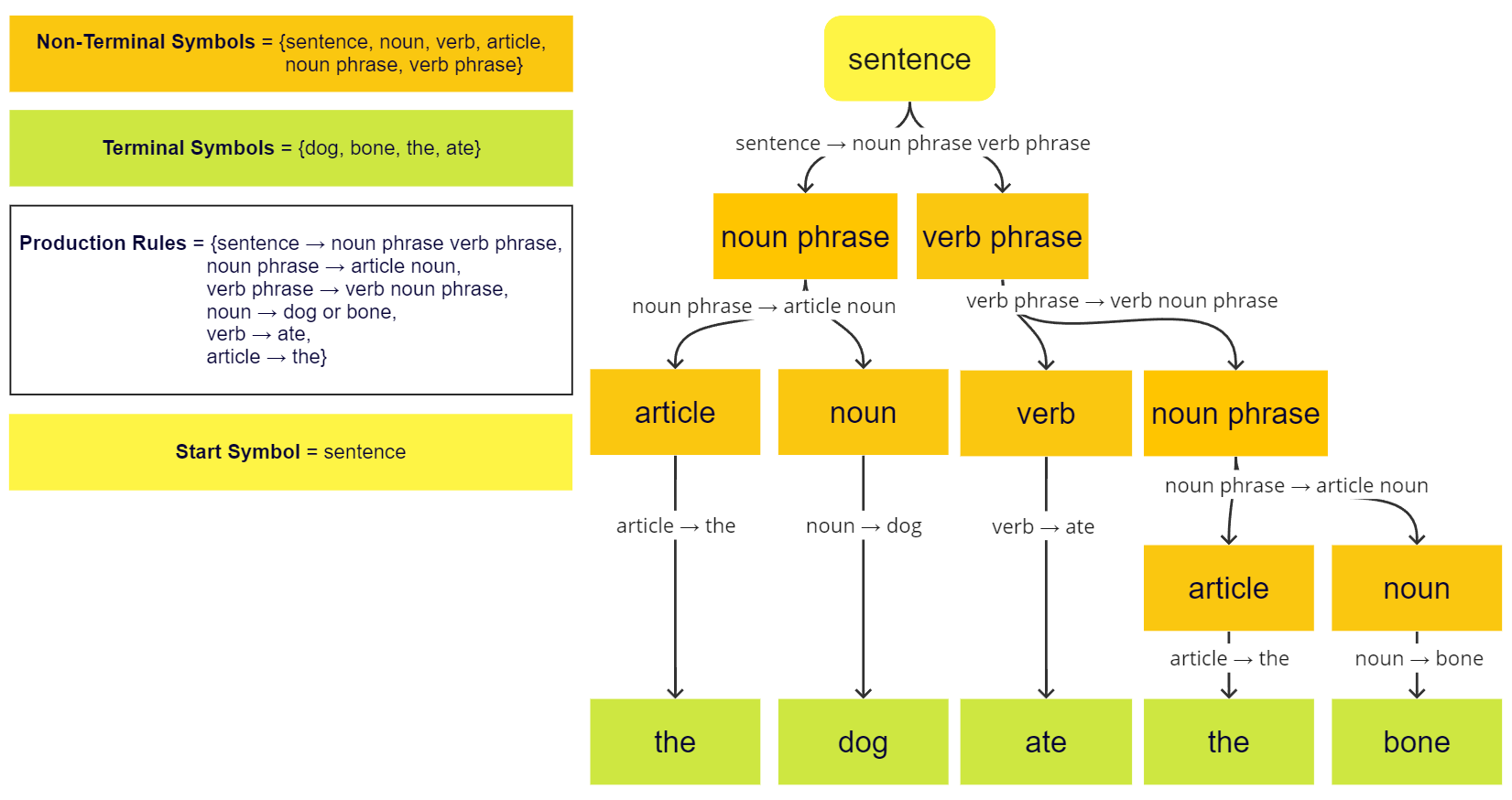
The string "the dog ate the bone" was created using production rules that replaced nonterminal with terminal symbols.

In formal languages, terminal and nonterminal symbols are parts of the vocabulary under a formal grammar. Vocabulary is a finite, nonempty set of symbols. Terminal symbols are symbols that cannot be replaced by other symbols of the vocabulary. Nonterminal symbols are symbols that can be replaced by other symbols of the vocabulary by the production rules under the same formal grammar.

A formal grammar defines a formal language over the vocabulary of the grammar.

In the context of formal language, the term vocabulary is more commonly known as alphabet. Nonterminal symbols are also called syntactic variables.

== Psychoanalysis, rhetoric, and archetypes ==
An alternative definition of symbol, distinguishing it from the term sign was proposed by Swiss psychoanalyst Carl Jung. In his studies on what is now called Jungian archetypes, a sign stands for something known, as a word stands for its referent. He contrasted a sign with a symbol: something that is unknown and that cannot be made clear or precise. An example of a symbol in this sense is Christ as a symbol of the archetype called self.

Kenneth Burke described Homo sapiens as a "symbol-using, symbol making, and symbol misusing animal" to suggest that a person creates symbols as well as misuses them. One example he uses to indicate what he means by the misuse of the symbol is the story of a man who, when told that a particular food item was whale blubber, could barely keep from throwing it up. Later, his friend discovered it was actually just a dumpling. But the man's reaction was a direct consequence of the symbol of "blubber" representing something inedible in his mind. In addition, the symbol of "blubber" was created by the man through various kinds of learning.

Burke goes on to describe symbols as also being derived from Sigmund Freud's work on condensation and displacement, further stating that symbols are not just relevant to the theory of dreams but also to "normal symbol systems". He says they are related through "substitution", where one word, phrase, or symbol is substituted for another in order to change the meaning. In other words, if one person does not understand a certain word or phrase, another person may substitute a synonym or symbol in order to get the meaning across. However, upon learning the new way of interpreting a specific symbol, the person may change his or her already-formed ideas to incorporate the new information.

Jean Dalby Clift says that people not only add their own interpretations to symbols, but they also create personal symbols that represent their own understanding of their lives: what she calls "core images" of the person. Clift argues that symbolic work with these personal symbols or core images can be as useful as working with dream symbols in psychoanalysis or counseling.

William Indick suggests that the symbols that are commonly found in myth, legend, and fantasy fulfill psychological functions and hence are why archetypes such as "the hero", "the princess" and "the witch" have remained popular for centuries.

== Symbolic value ==
Symbols can carry symbolic value in three primary forms: Ideological, comparative, and isomorphic. Ideological symbols such as religious and state symbols convey complex sets of beliefs and ideas that indicate "the right thing to do". Comparative symbols such as prestigious office addresses, fine art, and prominent awards indicate answers to questions of "better or worse" and "superior or inferior". Isomorphic symbols blend in with the surrounding cultural environment such that they enable individuals and organizations to conform to their surroundings and evade social and political scrutiny. Examples of symbols with isomorphic value include wearing a professional dress during business meetings, shaking hands to greet others in the West, or bowing to greet others in the East. A single symbol can carry multiple distinct meanings such that it provides multiple types of symbolic value.

== Paul Tillich ==
Paul Tillich argued that, while signs are invented and forgotten, symbols are born and die. There are, therefore, dead and living symbols. A living symbol can reveal to an individual hidden levels of meaning and transcendent or religious realities. For Tillich a symbol always "points beyond itself" to something that is unquantifiable and mysterious; symbols open up the "depth dimension of reality itself". Symbols are complex, and their meanings can evolve as the individual or culture evolves. When a symbol loses its meaning and power for an individual or culture, it becomes a dead symbol. When a symbol becomes identified with the deeper reality to which it refers, it becomes idolatrous as the "symbol is taken for reality." The symbol itself is substituted for the deeper meaning it intends to convey. The unique nature of a symbol is that it gives access to deeper layers of reality that are otherwise inaccessible.

== Role of context in symbolism ==
A symbol's meaning may be modified by various factors including popular usage, history, and contextual intent.

The history of a symbol is one of many factors in determining a particular symbol's apparent meaning. Consequently, symbols with emotive power carry problems analogous to false etymologies.

The context of a symbol may change its meaning. Similar five-pointed stars might signify a law enforcement officer or a member of the armed services, depending upon the uniform.

== Symbols in cartography ==
The three categories of cartographic symbol shapes

Symbols are used in cartography to communicate geographical information (generally as point, line, or area features). As with other symbols, visual variables such as size, shape, orientation, texture, and pattern provide meaning to the symbol. According to semiotics, map symbols are "read" by map users when they make a connection between the graphic mark on the map (the sign), a general concept (the interpretant), and a particular feature of the real world (the referent). Map symbols can thus be categorized by how they suggest this connection:

- Pictorial symbols (also "image", "iconic", or "replicative") appears as the real-world feature, although it is often in a generalized manner; e.g. a tree icon to represents a forest or green denoting vegetation.
- Functional symbols (also "representational") directly represent the activity that takes place at the represented feature; e.g. a picture of a skier to represent a ski resort or a tent to represent a campground.
- Conceptual symbols directly represent a concept related to the represented feature; e.g. a dollar sign to represent an ATM, or a Star of David to represent a Jewish synagogue.
- Conventional symbols (also "associative") do not have any intuitive relationship but are so commonly used that map readers eventually learn to recognize them; e.g. a red line to represent a highway or a cross to represent a hospital.
- Abstract/geometric symbols (also "ad hoc") are arbitrary shapes chosen by the cartographer to represent a certain feature.

== Related terms ==
A symbolic action is an action that symbolizes or signals what the actor wants or believes. The action conveys meaning to the viewers. Symbolic action may overlap with symbolic speech, such as the use of flag burning to express hostility or saluting the flag to express patriotism. In response to intense public criticism, businesses, organizations, and governments may take symbolic actions rather than, or in addition to, directly addressing the identified problems.

=== Computer encoding ===
Unicode (also known as The Unicode Standard and TUS) is a character encoding standard maintained by the Unicode Consortium designed to support the use of text in all of the world's writing systems that can be digitized. Version 18.0 defines 172,808 characters and 175 scripts used in various ordinary, literary, academic and technical contexts.

Unicode has largely supplanted the previous environment of myriad incompatible character sets used within different locales and on different computer architectures. The entire repertoire of these sets, plus many additional characters, were merged into the single Unicode set. Unicode is used to encode the vast majority of text on the Internet, including most web pages, and relevant Unicode support has become a common consideration in contemporary software development. Unicode is ultimately capable of encoding more than 1.1 million characters.

The Unicode character repertoire is synchronized with ISO/IEC 10646, each being code-for-code identical with one another. However, The Unicode Standard is more than just a repertoire within which characters are assigned. To aid developers and designers, the standard also provides charts and reference data, as well as annexes explaining concepts germane to various scripts, providing guidance for their implementation. Topics covered by these annexes include character normalization, character composition and decomposition, collation, and directionality.

Unicode encodes 3,972 emoji, with the continued development thereof conducted by the Consortium as a part of the standard. The standardization of Unicode was a major factor in enabling their widespread adoption outside of Japan.

Unicode text is processed and stored as binary data using one of several encodings, which define how to translate the standard's abstracted codes for characters into sequences of bytes. The Unicode Standard itself defines three encodings: UTF-8, UTF-16, (Note: A large amount of documentation for Windows incorrectly uses the term "Unicode" to mean only the UTF-16 encoding.) and UTF-32, though several others exist. UTF-8 is the most widely used by a large margin, in part due to its backwards-compatibility with ASCII.

== See also ==
- Artistic symbol – Representation that conveys deeper meaning
- Emblem – Pictorial image that epitomizes a concept or that represents a person
- Icon (religious) and secular icon
- List of symbols
- Logo – Graphic mark representing an entity
- National symbol – Symbol of a national community
- Pictogram – Ideogram that conveys its meaning through its pictorial resemblance to a physical object
- Proto-writing – Symbols that communicate ideas but not language
- Symbolic interactionism – Sociological theory
- Unicode symbols – Unicode text character not part of a natural language script
- Universal language – Hypothetical language
