= Rell =

Rell may refer to:

- Rell (singer), Gerrell Gaddis (born 1976), American R&B singer
- Hell Rell, Durrell Mohammad (born 1979), American rapper
- Jodi Rell (1946–2024) American politician, Governor of Connecticut 2004–2011
- Lou Rell (1940–2014), American aviator
- Rell Harwood (born 2001), American freestyle skier
- Rell Sunn (1950–1998), American surfer
- RELL, a model of the Bristol RE single-decker bus

== See also ==
- Rel (disambiguation)
