= Legality of incest =

Legality of sexual relationships between family members

Laws regarding incest (i.e. sexual activity between family members or close relatives) vary considerably between jurisdictions, and depend on the type of sexual activity and the nature of the family relationship of the parties involved, as well as the age and sex of the parties. Besides legal prohibitions and medical discouragements, at least some forms of incest are also socially taboo or frowned upon in most cultures around the world.

Incest laws may involve restrictions on marriage, which also vary between jurisdictions. When incest involves an adult and a child (under the age of consent) it is considered to be a form of child sexual abuse.

== Degrees of relationship ==
Laws regarding incest are sometimes expressed in terms of degrees of relationship. The degree of relationship is calculated by adding the number of generations back to a closest common ancestor of each individual. Consanguinity (but not affinity) relationships may be summarized as follows:

Degree of relationship	Relationship	Average DNA shared %
	Inbred strain	99%
0	identical twins; clones	100%
1	parent-offspring	50%
1	full siblings	50%
2	3/4-siblings or sibling-cousins	37.5%
2	grandparent-grandchild	25%
2	half-siblings	25%
3	aunt/uncle-nephew/niece	25%
4	double first cousins	25%
3	great grandparent-great grandchild	12.5%
4	first cousins	12.5%
6	quadruple second cousins	12.5%
6	triple second cousins	9.38%
4	half-first cousins	6.25%
5	first cousins once removed	6.25%
6	double second cousins	6.25%
6	second cousins	3.13%
8	third cousins	0.78%
10	fourth cousins	0.20%

Most laws regarding prohibited degree of kinship concern relations of r = 25% or higher, while most permit unions of individuals with r = 12.5% or lower. In 24 states of the United States, cousin marriages are prohibited. Also, most laws make no provision for the rare case of marriage between double first cousins. Incest laws may also include prohibitions of unions between biologically unrelated individuals if there is a close legal relationship, such as adoption or step relations.

== World map ==
Consensual incest between adult siblings by country: Legal Illegal only if it provokes public scandal Illegal for same-sex couples; legal for opposite-sex couples Illegal for opposite-sex couples; legal for same-sex couples Illegal (prison sentence) Illegal (up to life imprisonment) Illegal (death penalty)

== Table ==
Country	Incest between consenting adults	Prohibited relationships	Penalties
Afghanistan	No Illegal	Lineal ancestors and descendants; Full and half-siblings	No Death
Albania	No Illegal	Lineal ancestors and descendants; Full and half-siblings	Up to 7 years in prison
Algeria	No Illegal	Relatives in the descending or ascending line; Full, consanguineous or uterine brothers and sisters; A person and the child of one of his full, consanguineous or uterine brothers or sisters or with a descendant thereof; The mother or the father and the husband or the wife, the widower or the widow of his child or of another of his descendants; Stepmother or stepfather and the descendant of the other spouse; Persons one of whom is the wife or husband of a brother or sister	The penalty is ten (10) to twenty (20) years of imprisonment in the 1st and 2nd cases, five (5) years to ten (10) years of imprisonment in the 3rd, 4th and 5th cases and from two (2) years to five (5) years imprisonment in the 6th case
Angola	Yes Legal		
Antigua and Barbuda	No Illegal	Parent, child, brother, sister, grandparent, grandchild, uncle (by blood), niece, aunt (by blood) or nephew	For life, if committed by an adult with a person under fourteen years of age; For fifteen years, if committed by an adult with a person fourteen years of age or more; For two years, if committed between minors fourteen years of age or more
Argentina	Yes Legal		
Armenia	No Illegal		
Australia	No Illegal	Varies by state	Varies by state (up to life imprisonment in one state: Queensland)
Austria	No Illegal (Penile-vaginal intercourse)/ Yes Legal (other practices)	Penile-vaginal intercourse between lineal ancestors and descendants; Penile-vaginal intercourse between full and half-siblings	Up to 1 year in prison or 720 "day-fines" for linear ancestors and descendants; Up to 3 years in prison for linear ancestors, who have seduced their descendants; Up to 6 months in prison or 360 "day-fines" for siblings
Azerbaijan	No Illegal		
(The Bahamas) Bahamas	No Illegal	Parent, child, brother, sister, grandparent, grandchild, uncle (by blood), niece, aunt (by blood) or nephew	If he is an adult who commits the offence with a minor, for life subject to, on a first conviction for the offence, a term of imprisonment of seven years, and in the case of a second or subsequent conviction for the offence, a term of imprisonment of fourteen years; If he is an adult who commits the offence with another adult, for a term of ten years; If he is a minor who commits the offence with another minor, for a term of two years
Bangladesh	No Illegal	Lineal ancestors and descendants; Full and half-siblings	Life imprisonment
Barbados	No Illegal	Parent, child, brother, sister, grandparent, grandchild, uncle (by blood), niece, aunt (by blood) or nephew	If committed by an adult with a person under 14 years of age, for life; If committed by an adult with a person 14 years of age or more, for 10 years; If committed between minors 14 years of age or more, for 2 years
Belarus	Yes Legal		
Belgium	Yes Legal		
Belize	No Illegal	Granddaughter, daughter, sister, half-sister, mother, grandfather, father, brother, half-brother or son	Imprisonment for seven years
Benin	No Illegal		
Bhutan	No Illegal	A person to whom the defendant is related by consanguinity or affinity in such a way that they cannot legally marry	
Bolivia	Yes Legal		
Bosnia and Herzegovina	No Illegal		
Botswana	No Illegal	Grandchild, child, brother, sister or parent	Up to 5 years in prison
Brazil	Yes Legal		
Brunei	No Illegal	Lineal ancestors and descendants; Full and half-siblings	No Death (Syariah Penal Code); Up to ten years in prison (Secular Penal Code)
Bulgaria	No Illegal	Lineal ancestors and descendants; Adopters and adopted persons; Full and half-siblings	Up to three years in prison
Burkina Faso	No Illegal		
(Cape Verde) Cabo Verde	Yes Legal		
Cambodia	Yes Legal		
Canada	No Illegal	Child/parent or grandchild/grandparent; Full and half-siblings	Up to 14 years in prison
Central African Republic	Yes Legal		
Chile	No Illegal	Consanguineal ancestors and descendants; Consanguineal siblings	From 61 days up to 3 years and 1 day in prison
China	Yes Legal		
Colombia	Yes Illegal	Consanguineal and adopted ancestors and descendants; Consanguineal and adopted siblings	From 16 up to 72 months in prison
Costa Rica	Yes Legal		
Croatia	No Illegal	Linear ancestors and descendants; Full and half-siblings	Up to one year in prison
Cuba	No Illegal		
Czech Republic	No Illegal	Lineal ancestors and descendants; Siblings; Related by blood or adoption	Up to three years in prison
Democratic Republic of the Congo	Yes Legal		
Denmark	No Illegal	Lineal ancestors and descendants; Full and half-siblings	Up to six years in prison (direct line); Up to two years in prison (siblings)
Dominica	No Illegal	Parent and child; Brother and sister, whether of the whole or the half blood, and whether the relationship is traced through lawful wedlock or not; Uncle and niece or aunt and nephew; Grandparent and grandchild	For twenty-five years, if committed by an adult with a person under fourteen years of age; For ten years, if committed by an adult with a person fourteen years of age or more; For two years, if committed between minors
Dominican Republic	Yes Legal		
Ecuador	Yes Legal		
El Salvador	Yes Legal		
Eritrea	No Illegal	Grandparent—grandchild or parent—child; Brother or half brother, sister or half-sister; Same-sex relations are always prohibited	From one to three years in prison
Estonia	No Illegal (only incest between parent and child or grandparent and grandchild is illegal, incest between siblings is legal)	Grandparent—grandchild or parent—child	From two to eight years in prison
Eswatini	No Illegal	Offspring, sibling, parent or grandparent	25 years, if aged 14 years or less; 20 years, if aged 14–18 years; 10 years and E50.000, if 18 years or more; 4 years and E20.000, if 18 years or more with consent
Ethiopia	No Illegal	Blood relatives whose marriage is prohibited by respective law; Same-sex relations are always prohibited	From three months to three years in prison
Federated States of Micronesia	Yes Legal (1 state: Kosrae) / No Illegal (3 states: Yap, Pohnpei and Chuuk)		Up to three years in prison (in Pohnpei and Yap); Up to three months in prison (in Chuuk)
Fiji	No Illegal	"Carnal knowledge of" (sexual intercourse with) parent, grandparent or sibling.	Imprisonment for 20 years.
France	Yes Legal		
Gabon	Yes Legal		
(Georgia (country)) Georgia	No Illegal	Lineal ancestors and descendants; Full and half-siblings	Up to two years in prison
Germany	No Illegal (Penile-vaginal intercourse)/ Yes Legal (other practices)	Lineal ancestors and descendants with Penile-vaginal intercourse; Full and half-siblings with Penile-vaginal intercourse	Up to three years in prison or fine (descendants and siblings under 18 are not punished)
Ghana	No Illegal	Lineal ancestors and descendants; Full and half-siblings	Prison sentence
Greece	No Illegal	Lineal ancestors and descendants; Full and half-siblings; Uncle or aunt (by blood); Nephew or niece	More than 10 years in prison for the ascending relative if the descending relative is 14 years old or younger, imprisonment if 15 to 17 years old, and up to two years in prison if 18 years and older; Up to two years in prison if siblings or half-siblings or for the descending relative
Grenada	No Illegal	Daughter/son, granddaughter/grandson, sister/brother, aunt/uncle (by blood) or niece/nephew	
Guatemala	Yes Legal		
Guinea-Bissau	Yes Legal		
Guyana	Yes Legal (for opposite-sex couples) / No Illegal (for same-sex couples)	Same sex couples	Life imprisonment
Haiti	Yes Legal		
Honduras	Yes Legal		
Hong Kong	Yes Legal (for same-sex couples) / No Illegal (for opposite-sex couples)	Granddaughter, daughter, sister or mother (male); Grandfather, father, brother or son (female)	Life imprisonment if aged 12 or younger; 20 years imprisonment if aged 13 to 15; 14 years imprisonment if aged 16 or older; Consent of the Secretary of Justice is required for a prosecution
Hungary	No Illegal	Lineal ancestors and descendants; Sibling	Imprisonment not exceeding three years (for relatives in direct line); imprisonment not exceeding two years (for siblings)
Iceland	No Illegal	Lineal ancestors and descendants; Full and half-siblings	Up to eight years in prison for ascending relative; Up to 12 years if descending relative is between 15 and 17 years old; Up to four years in prison for siblings
India	No Legal	While there is no specific law in India that criminalizes consensual sexual relationships between adult relatives (hence technically considered "legal"), such relationships are heavily taboo and prohibited under most personal and marriage laws, such as the Hindu Marriage Act, 1955, which forbids unions within degrees of "sapinda" relationship unless custom permits. In some cases, courts have intervened based on public morality concerns, and other laws (e.g., the Protection of Children from Sexual Offences Act or Sections 376 and 354 of the IPC) apply where coercion, abuse, or minors are involved.	
Indonesia	No Illegal	Lineal ancestors and descendants; Full and half-siblings; Uncle or aunt (by blood) (unless government permission explicitly required); Nephew or niece (unless government permission explicitly required); Grandaunt (by blood), granduncle (by blood), grandniece, grandnephew (unless government permission explicitly required)	Up to 10 years in prison
(Republic of Ireland) Ireland	Yes Legal (same-sex couples) / No Illegal (opposite-sex couples)	Granddaughter, daughter, mother, sister or half-sister (male); Grandfather, father, son, brother or half-brother (female)	Up to 10 years in prison (male and female)
Iran	No Illegal	Lineal ancestors and descendants; Full and half-siblings	No Death
Israel	Yes Legal (if aged 21 or older) / No Illegal (if aged 20 or younger)	Lineal ancestors and descendants with 20 years old or younger	Up to 16 years in prison if aged 20 or younger
Italy	No / Yes Legal (unless it provokes public scandal)		From two to eight years in prison
Ivory Coast	Yes Legal		
Jamaica	Yes Legal (for opposite-sex couples) / No Illegal (for same-sex couples)	Same sex couples	Ten years imprisonment with hard labour
Japan	Yes Legal (If both relatives are 18 years of age or older)	If anyone is under 18 years old (17 years old or younger), the offenses become indecent assault by a guardian and sexual intercourse by a guardian in custody under the Article 179 of Japanese Penal Code.; It also prohibits marriage between close blood relatives under the Article 734 of the Japanese Civil Code.	6 months to 10 years imprisonment
Kazakhstan	No Illegal	Close blood relatives	
Kenya	Yes Illegal	"Indecent" acts or acts causing penetration with: daughter, granddaughter, sister, mother, niece, aunt or grandmother (if male); son, father, grandson, grand father, brother, nephew or uncle (if female).	Imprisonment for a term of not less than ten years.
Kiribati	Yes Illegal	Sexual intercourse with: granddaughter, daughter, sister or mother (if male); grandfather, father, brother or son (if female from the age of 15)	Imprisonment for 7 years.
Kosovo	No Illegal		
Kyrgyzstan	Yes Legal		
Laos	Yes Illegal	Biological parent, parent by adoption, step-parent, grandparent, parent in law, biological child, adopted child, step-child, grandchild or sibling	Six months to five years of imprisonment and a fine from 500,000 Kip to 2,000,000 Kip; Three months to one year of imprisonment and a fine from 50,000 Kip to 300,000 Kip (for partners)
Latvia	Yes Legal		
Lesotho	No Illegal	Grandparent, grandchild, parent, child, sibling	
Liberia	No Illegal	Lineal ancestors and descendants; Full and half-siblings	Up to three years in prison
Liechtenstein	No Illegal	Lineal ancestors and descendants; Full and half-siblings	Up to 3 years in prison or fine
Lithuania	Yes Legal		
Luxembourg	Yes Legal (1810–1941 and since 1944/45 (1942–1944/45 illegal pursuant to § 173 German penal code)		
Macau	Yes Legal		
Madagascar	Yes Legal		
Malaysia	No Illegal	Relationships that are not permitted to marry under "the law, religion, custom or usage applicable to him or her".	From 10 to 30 years in prison; Caning
Malawi	No Illegal	"Carnal knowledge of" (sexual intercourse with): grand-daughter, daughter, sister, mother or grandmother (if male); grandfather, father, brother, or son (if female from the age of 16).	Imprisonment for five years.
Mali	No Illegal		
Marshall Islands	No Illegal	Marriage, cohabitation or sexual intercourse with another of such a close blood relationship or affinity that marriage between the two who so engage is prohibited by custom.	Classified as felony of the third degree, which is punishable by a fine of $5,000 or imprisonment for no more than thirty-five months.
Mauritius	No Illegal	Lineal ancestors and descendants; Full and half-siblings	Imprisonment
Mexico	No Illegal	Varies by state	Varies by state
Moldova	Yes Illegal	Relatives in the direct line up to and including the third degree of kinship, as well as between relatives in the collateral line (brothers and sisters)	Imprisonment for up to 5 years; Not subject to criminal liability if under 18 years of age and the age difference between them does not exceed 2 years
Mongolia	Yes Legal		
Montenegro	No Illegal		
Mozambique	Yes Legal		
Myanmar	No Illegal		
Nauru	No Illegal	Lineal ancestors and descendants; Full and half-siblings	10 years imprisonment,
Nepal	No Illegal	Lineal ancestors and descendants; Collateral relatives within (including) 7 degrees	Imprisonment for life for sexual intercourse between the natural mother and her natural son or between the natural father and his natural daughter; Imprisonment for four to ten years and a fine of रु (rupees) 40,000–100,000 for sexual intercourse between: stepmother and stepson; stepfather and stepdaughter; full blood brother and sister; father-in-law and daughter-in-law within the same branch; grandfather and granddaughter or great-granddaughter within the same branch; brother-in-law and sister-in-law within the same branch; Imprisonment for three to six years and a fine of रु 30,000–60,000 for sexual intercourse between: grandmother and her grandson or great-grandson within the three generations of the same branch; father's elder brother or uncle and niece within the same branch; aunt (including the wife of own father's brother) within the same branch; father-in-law and brother's daughter-in-law within the same branch; uterine maternal uncle and niece or nephew and maternal aunt; mother's sister and nephew or between mother-in-law (one's wife side) and son-in-law; Imprisonment for one to three years and a fine of रु 10,000–30,000, having regard to, inter alia, the branch, relationship and generation, for sexual intercourse between persons in collateral relatives within (including) 7 degrees, except that referred to in clause (a), (b) or (c)
Netherlands	Yes Legal		
New Zealand	No Illegal	Lineal ancestors and descendants; Full or half-siblings	Up to 10 years in prison
Nicaragua	Yes Legal		
Niger	No Illegal		
Nigeria	No Illegal	Lineal ancestors and descendants; Full and half-siblings	No Death
North Korea	No Illegal	Lineal ancestors and descendants; Collateral relatives within (including) 4 degrees	No Death
North Macedonia	No Illegal	Linear ancestors and descendants; Full and half-siblings	Up to three years in prison
Northern Cyprus	No Illegal	Child, grandchild, sibling, adopted child or child of his/her sibling who is below the age of 18; Grandchildren, child, mother, father, grandfather, grandmother, aunt, uncle, maternal uncle or aunt who is more than 18 and aware of the familial relation between the two; Sibling, step-sibling, adopted sibling who is also between 16 and 18	Life imprisonment; Up to six months imprisonment or a fine
Norway	No Illegal	Lineal ancestors and descendants; Siblings; Stepfamily; Adopted descendants	Up to six years in prison
Pakistan	No Illegal	Lineal ancestors and descendants; Full and half-siblings	No Death
Palau	No Illegal	Within the degrees of consanguinity or affinity within which marriage is prohibited by law or custom	Imprisonment for a period of not more than twenty-five years, or fined up to fifty thousand dollars ($50,000), or both
Panama	Yes Legal		
Paraguay	Yes Legal		
Peru	Yes Legal		
Philippines	No Illegal	Lineal ancestors and descendants; Collateral relatives within (including) 4 degrees; Step parents and step children; Parents-in-law and children-in-law	From two years to six years in prison
Poland	No Illegal	Lineal ancestors and descendants; Adopted children and parents; Full and half-siblings	From three months to five years in prison
Portugal	Yes Legal		
Qatar	No Illegal	Lineal ancestors and descendants; Full and half-siblings	No Death
Republic of the Congo	Yes Legal		
Romania	No Illegal	Lineal ancestors and descendants; Full and half-siblings	Between one and five years of imprisonment
Russia	Yes Legal		
Samoa	Yes Legal (if aged 21 or older) / No Illegal (if under the age of 21)	parent and child, siblings, half-siblings, or grandparent and grandchild; "child" includes an illegitimate child or an adopted child; and "grandchild" has a corresponding meaning	Imprisonment for a term not exceeding 14 years
São Tomé and Príncipe	Yes Legal		
Saudi Arabia	No Illegal	Lineal ancestors and descendants; Full and half-siblings	No Death
Saint Kitts and Nevis	Yes Legal		
Saint Lucia	No Illegal		Up to 14 years in prison
Saint Vincent and the Grenadines	Yes Legal (for opposite-sex couples) / No Illegal (for same-sex couples)		For same-sex couples: Ten years of imprisonment
Senegal	No Illegal	Lineal ancestors and descendants; Full and half-siblings	Up to three years in prison
Serbia	Yes Legal		
Seychelles	No Illegal	Grandfather, father, brother, half-brother, son or grandson; grandmother, mother, sister, half-sister, daughter or grand-daughter	Imprisonment for 3 years
Sierra Leone	No Illegal	Brother, half-brother, nephew, father, son or grandfather; Sister, half-sister, mother, grandmother, daughter or niece	Imprisonment for a term not less than five years and not exceeding fifteen years
Singapore	No Illegal	Lineal ancestors and descendants; Full and half-siblings; Uncle (by blood), aunt (by blood), nephew, niece	Up to five years in prison
Slovakia	Yes legal (for same-sex couples) / No Illegal (for opposite-sex couples)		
Slovenia	Yes Legal		
South Africa	No Illegal	Ascendants and descendants in the direct line; Collaterals, if either of them is related to their common ancestor in the first degree of descent	
South Korea	Yes Legal		
Somalia	No Illegal	Lineal ancestors and descendants; Full and half-siblings	No Death
South Sudan	No Illegal	Lineal ancestors and descendants; Half or full sibling, uncle (by blood), aunt (by blood), niece, nephew; Same-sex relations are always prohibited	Up to seven years in prison; Fine
Spain	Yes Legal		
Sri Lanka	No Illegal	Directly descend from the other, adoptive parent, adoptive grand parent, adopted child or adopted grand child; Sister, either by the full or the half blood or by adoption, daughter of his brother or of his sister, by the full or the half blood or by adoption, a descendant from either of them, the daughter of his wife by another father, his son's or grandson's or father's or grandfather's widow; Brother of the female either by the full or the half blood or by adoption, the son of her brother or sister by the full or the half blood or by adoption, a descendant from either of them, the son of her husband by another mother, her deceased daughter's or grand daughter's or mother's or grand mother's husband	Imprisonment for a term not less than seven years and not exceeding twenty years and with fine; Imprisonment for a terms which may extend to two years (if attempted)
Sudan	No Illegal	Lineal ancestors and descendants or their spouses; Sister, brother or their children, aunt (by blood) or uncle (by blood); Same-sex relations are always prohibited	No Death if relations are same-sex; Additional punishment of up to five years in prison otherwise
Suriname	Yes Legal		
Sweden	No Illegal	Lineal ancestors and descendants; Full siblings; Half-siblings (without explicit government permission)	Imprisonment up to 2 years for lineal ancestors and descendants; Imprisonment up to 1 year for full sibling; Imprisonment up to 1 year for half-sibling (unless government permission explicitly required)
Switzerland	No Illegal (Penile-vaginal intercourse)/ Yes Legal (other practices)	Lineal ancestors and descendants with Penile-vaginal intercourse; Full and half-siblings with Penile-vaginal intercourse	Up to three years in prison or fine
Syria	No Illegal	Parents and offspring, brothers and sister, step-brother and step-sister, or those of the same category among in-laws	One to three years imprisonment; If one of the offenders has legal or actual authority over the victim, the penalty shall not be less than two years, and the offender is denied the right of guardianship.
Taiwan	No Illegal	Lineal ancestors and descendants.; Collateral relatives within (including) 3 degrees.	Up to five years imprisonment, but prosecution cannot start without a complaint by the victim within six months of them being aware of the identity of the offender (Antragsdelikt).
Tajikistan	Yes Legal		
Tanzania	No Illegal	Granddaughter, daughter, sister or mother (male); Grandfather, father, brother or son (female); Same-sex relations are always prohibited	Up to five years in prison
Thailand	Yes Legal		
Timor-Leste	Yes Legal		
Togo	No Illegal	Lineal ancestors and descendants; Full and half-siblings	Prison sentence
Trinidad and Tobago	No Illegal	Parent, child, brother, sister, grandparent, grandchild, uncle (by blood), niece, aunt (by blood) or nephew	Imprisonment for life
Tunisia	No Illegal	The rape of a child that is carried out by: Brothers and sisters; The son of any of his or her brothers or sisters; Any of their descendants; The husband's father or the wife's father or the mother's husband or the father's wife or the husband's family; Persons who are spouses of a brother or sister	Twelve years imprisonment (six years for indecent assault, doubled if the perpetrator is a family member or relative of the victim)
Turkey	Yes Legal		
Turkmenistan	No Illegal	Lineal ancestors and descendants; Full and half-siblings	Prison sentence
Uganda	No Illegal	Lineal ancestors and descendants; Full and half-siblings	Life imprisonment
Ukraine	Yes Legal		
United Arab Emirates	No Illegal	Lineal ancestors and descendants; Full and half-siblings	No Death
United Kingdom	No Illegal	Parent, grandparent, child, grandchild; Brother, sister, half-brother, half-sister; Uncle or aunt (by blood); Nephew or niece	Up to 7 years imprisonment for sex between adult relatives (penetration); Up to 14 years imprisonment for sexual activity with a child family member; Up to life imprisonment for rape against child under 13.
United States	Yes legal (only 2 states: Rhode Island and New Jersey) / No Illegal (other 48 states, but in Ohio, only incest between parent and child or grandparent and grandchild is illegal, incest between siblings is legal)	Varies by states	Varies by states (up to life imprisonment in four states: Idaho, Kentucky, Montana, Nevada)
Uruguay	No / Yes Legal (unless it provokes public scandal)		
Uzbekistan	No Illegal	Lineal ancestors and descendants; Full and half-siblings	Prison sentence
Vanuatu	No Illegal	Starting from the age of 16 for both sexes, sexual intercourse between: parent and child (including an adopted child); brother and sister (including half blood); grandparent and grandchild.	Imprisonment for 10 years.
Venezuela	No / Yes Legal (unless it provokes public scandal)		
Vietnam	No Illegal	Lineal ancestors and descendants; Full and half-siblings	From one to five years in prison
Zambia	No Illegal	Granddaughter, daughter, sister, mother (male); Grandfather, father, brother, son (female); Same-sex relations are always prohibited	Up to five years in prison
Zimbabwe	No Illegal	Lineal ancestors and descendants; Collateral relatives within (including) 6 degrees	Up to five years in prison, or fine up to US$5000, or both

== Countries in Africa that criminalize incest ==
=== Zimbabwe ===
In Zimbabwe, most forms of incest are illegal and an offender is currently liable to a fine up to or exceeding level fourteen (about US$5000) or imprisonment for a period not exceeding five years or both. Incest is classified as "sexual intercourse within a prohibited degree of relationship". A prohibited degree of relationship would be that of a parent and their natural or adoptive child, a step-parent and their step-child, whether the step-child's parent and step-parent are married under the Marriage Act [Chapter 5:11] or the Customary Marriages Act [Chapter 5:07], or are parties to an unregistered customary law marriage, and whether or not the child was over the age of eighteen years at the time of the marriage; a brother and sister, whether of whole or half blood; or an uncle and his niece; or a grand-uncle and his grand-niece; or an aunt and her nephew; or a grand-aunt and her grand-nephew; or a grandparent and their grandchild and any person and their first or second cousin. In cases of first and second cousins an individual charged with such a crime can raise a defense that the cultural or religious customs or traditions of the community to which they belong does not prohibit marriage between first or second cousins; or in the case of a person who is a member of a community governed by customary law, that the cultural or religious customs or traditions of the particular community to which they belong does not prohibit marriage between first or second cousins.

== Countries in the Americas that criminalize incest ==
=== Canada ===
Under Canadian federal law, incest is defined as having a sexual relationship with a sibling (including half-sibling), child/parent or grandchild/grandparent, requiring knowledge of the existence of the blood relationship. Everyone who commits incest is guilty of an indictable offence and is liable to imprisonment for a term of not more than 14 years and, if the other person is under the age of 16 years, to a minimum punishment of imprisonment for a term of five years.

=== United States ===
Laws regarding incest in the United States vary widely among jurisdictions regarding both the definition of the offense and penalties for its commission. The laws regarding incest in the United States article summarizes these laws for individual U.S. states and the District of Columbia.

In the United States, the District of Columbia and every state and inhabited territory have some form of codified incest prohibition. In most states, sexual activity between a lineal ancestor and a lineal descendant (parent, grandparent with child or grandchild), siblings (brother-sister) and aunt-nephew, uncle-niece is penalized as incest. However, individual statutes vary widely. Rhode Island has repealed its criminal incest statute, and only criminalizes incestuous marriage. Ohio "targets only parental figures", and New Jersey penalize it either as aggravated sexual assault when both parties are under 16 years of age, as sexual assault over 16 years of age but under 18, or as "sexual conduct which would impair or debauch the morals of the child" in the case of a parent or another adult having legal care of a child under 18 years of age. The most severe penalties for incest are in Massachusetts, Virginia, Texas and Oregon, which punish incest with up to 20 years in prison, Georgia where a penalty for incest is up to 30 years in prison, Wisconsin where the penalty for incest is up to 40 years in prison, and in the states of Colorado, Nevada, Montana, Idaho and Michigan where a penalty of up to life imprisonment for incest may be given.

In some states, sex between first cousins is prohibited (see cousin marriage law in the United States by state for cousin sex, as well as cousin marriage, being outlawed in some states). Many states also apply incest laws to non-blood relations, including stepparents, stepsiblings, in-laws and people related through adoption.

== Countries in Asia that criminalize incest ==
=== Hong Kong ===
In Hong Kong, a special administrative region of China, it is illegal to have sexual intercourse with certain close relatives, even if they are consenting adults. The prohibited relationships are grandfather-granddaughter, father-daughter, brother-sister and mother-son. Punishment is up to 20 years' imprisonment for male offenders and up to 14 years' imprisonment for female offenders. The law does not cover sexual intercourse with more distant relatives, such as an aunt, uncle, niece, nephew and cousin. It only addresses male-on-female and female-on-male sexual intercourse, and it appears that consensual same-sex incest is not illegal. The law makes an assumption that a female below the age of 16 has no ability to consent to sexual intercourse, therefore a female below 16 cannot commit incest.

On 5 December 2019, the Law Reform Commission of Hong Kong ("LRC") published a report on Review of Substantive Sexual Offences making final recommendations for the reform of substantive sexual offences in the Crimes Ordinance (Cap 200). It recommended that "the offence of incest should be reformed to become gender neutral; to cover all penile penetration of the mouth, vagina and anus and other forms of penetration; and be extended to cover uncles (aunts) and nieces (nephews) who are blood relatives as well as adoptive parents".

=== Malaysia ===
In Malaysia, it is illegal to have sexual intercourse with a person who under the law, religion, custom or usage that applies to the person he or she is not permitted to marry on account of their relationship.

In addition to whipping, persons convicted of incest face a minimum sentence of six years' imprisonment and a maximum sentence of 20 years' imprisonment. It is a defense against the charge if the person did not know the relationship was not permitted or if the sexual intercourse was done without his or her consent. Girls below the age of 16 and boys below the age of 13 are deemed to be incapable of giving consent. (The age of consent for sex in Malaysia is 16 for both sexes.)

While it is unclear to which family members the incest law applies, a verdict from the High Court in Sabah and Sarawak in 2011 provided some indication about the sentencing guidelines. It described incest as a "heinous crime" but that the degree of kinship between the parties dictates the "level of repulsion" which the court translates into a sentence imposed. The verdict said the worst on such a scale is incest committed by a father to his biological daughter or a brother to his biological sister, and that such offenders should receive the harshest sentence. It said an uncle and his maternal niece committing incest is not on that same level and, if there was no violence involved, the length of the sentence should reflect it.

There are more severe sentences for those who commit incest through rape. The offence of incestuous rape is punishable with not less than eight years' imprisonment and not more than 30 years' imprisonment. In addition, those convicted receive not less than 10 strokes.

Malaysian law also considers sexual intercourse with the stepfamily to be incestuous.

=== Pakistan ===
The legal code of Pakistan defines incest as marriage (consortion) between a male and either his:

- Wife or former wife of father, grandfather and further ancestors
- Mother, grandmother and further ancestors
- Daughter, granddaughter and further descendants
- Full or half-sister
- Parents' sisters, grandparents' sisters and further ancestors' sisters
- Daughter, granddaughter and further descendant of full or half-sibling
- Suckling ancestor
- Suckling sister
- Mother, grandmother and further ancestors of wife or former wife
- Daughter, granddaughter of wife or former wife
- Wife or former wife of true son or grandson and further descendants
- Sororal polygyny
- Close relations or blood relations

== Countries in Europe that criminalize incest ==
Countries that prohibit incest include: (all articles refer to the Penal Codes) Germany Article 173, Albania Article 106, Slovenia Article 195, Slovakia Section 203, Serbia Article 197, Poland Article 201, Norway Article 197 and 198, Hungary Article 199, Bulgaria Article 154, and Cyprus Article 147.

Countries that allow incest among consenting adults include Belarus, Belgium, Estonia, Latvia, Lithuania, France, Russia, Spain, Ukraine, and Portugal. Estonia, Latvia, and Ukraine prohibit incest if one has custody over the other.

=== Belarus ===
There is no law specifically criminalising incest in Belarus.

Section 168 of the criminal code, does however prohibit all forms of sexual activity (including incest) with anyone aged under 16 (the age of consent in Belarus).

=== Czech Republic ===
Section 188 of the Czech Criminal code prohibits incest between lineal ancestors and descendants and siblings. The maximum penalty is three years of imprisonment.

=== Denmark ===
In Denmark, incest is sex between lineal ancestors and descendants and between full or half-siblings. Sex with a descendant is punishable by up to six years imprisonment. Sex between siblings is punishable by up to two years imprisonment.

=== Estonia ===
In Estonia, sexual intercourse or commission of another act of sexual nature by a parent, person holding parental rights or grandparent with a child or grandchild is punishable by two to eight years imprisonment.

=== Finland ===
In Finland, sexual acts between one's sibling, ancestor or descendant are punishable by a fine or up to two years in prison for "sexual act between close relatives". However, no punishment is given to a person who was under 18 years old when performing a sexual act with a parent or grandparent or if the person was forced or illegally persuaded to perform the sexual act. The marriage law defines, that marriage between one's sibling, half-sibling, ancestor or descendant is forbidden.

=== France, Belgium, and Luxembourg ===
The French Penal Code of 1810, which was promulgated by Napoleon I, and became the criminal law in many of the territories occupied at the time by the First French Empire, abolished incest laws in France, Belgium, and Luxembourg.

In 2010, France reinstated laws against incest by introducing article 222-31-1 of the penal code. From February 10, 2010, to September 17, 2011, rape and sexual assault were classified as incest when they are committed "within the family on a minor by an ascendant, a brother, a sister or any other person, including a cohabitant of a family member, who has de jure or de facto authority over the victim".

There were subsequently multiple changes to the definition of incest.

On 16 September 2011, the Constitutional Council repealed article 222-31-1 of the penal code, saying that if it was possible for the legislator to institute a particular penal qualification to designate incestuous sexual acts, they could not, without disregarding the principle of legality of offences and penalties, refrain from precisely designating the persons who must be considered, within the meaning of this qualification, as members of the family.

Incest was once again reinstated in 2016. From March 16, 2016, to August 6, 2018, rape and sexual assault are considered incestuous when they are committed on a minor by:

1. An ancestor;
2. A brother, sister, uncle, aunt, nephew or niece;
3. The spouse or partner of one of the persons mentioned in (1) and (2) or the partner bound by a civil solidarity pact with one of the persons mentioned in 1 and 2, if he or she has de jure or de facto authority over the minor.

On 6 August 2018, "if he or she has de jure or de facto authority over the minor" in (3) was changed to "if he or she has de jure or de facto authority over the victim".

=== Germany ===
In Germany, illegal incest is defined as vaginal intercourse between lineal ancestors and descendants (parents, grandparents, great-grandparents and their children, grandchildren, great-grandchildren) and between full and half-siblings (due to this definition other sexual practices, including homosexual intercourse, are not punishable). The penalty is a fine or up to three years of prison. Descendants and siblings are not punished, if they are under 18. But also if both siblings are under 18 it remains a crime, therefore aiding and abetting of incest between related minors is punishable.

Regarding marriage, the same rules apply and prohibit marriage between aforementioned relatives, but also includes marriages between siblings by adoption.

The criminal liability of incest among consenting adults is disputed among German citizens and politicians. In the case of Patrick Stübing, the Federal Constitutional Court ruled in 2008 that the criminalization of incest is constitutional in a 7:1 vote with one judge dissenting.

In September 2014 the majority of the German Ethics Council recommended that the government abolish laws criminalizing consensual incest between adult siblings, while not broaching the question of to what extent criminal liability for incest between parents and children of legal age might be abrogated. A minority of nine members of the Council dissented, opposing a repeal of Section 173 of the Criminal Code

=== Greece ===
Article 345 of the Greek Penal Code as modified by Article 2, Paragraph 8 of Law 3625/2007 and Article 3 Paragraph 10 of Law 3727/2008 prohibits incestuous relations between relatives of both ascending and descending line, and between half or full siblings, and imposes (1) for the ascending relative (for example father, uncle, grandfather etc.): at least 10 years' imprisonment if the descending relative is under 15 years old, imprisonment if 15 but not 18 years old, and maximum two years' imprisonment if 18 years and older; (2) for the descending relative (for example child, nephew etc.) maximum two years' imprisonment; (3) for half- or full siblings maximum two years' imprisonment. Paragraph 2 of Article 345 Penal Code also states that if the descending relative and the half or full siblings were under 18 years old, they might be cleared of any charge.

Also, Article 1357 of the Greek Civil Code prohibits the marriage of relatives of direct blood line in totality, and up the four degrees of consanguinity of the secondary blood line (for example you can marry the first cousin of your mother / father, but not your first cousin), also the marriage of relatives five or six degrees of consanguinity is under permission only. Article 1358 of the Greek Civil Code also prohibits the marriage of relatives in law totally in direct blood line, and up the third degree of the secondary blood line.

=== Iceland ===
Article 200 of the Icelandic Penal Code prohibits incestuous relations between relatives of both ascending and descending line, and between half or full siblings, and (1) imposes for the ascending relative (for example father, uncle, grandfather etc.): imprisonment up to a maximum of 12 years if the descending relative is between 15 and 17 years old, imprisonment up to a maximum of eight years if 18 years and older; (2) for siblings a maximum four years' imprisonment—if the half or full siblings were under 18 years old, they might be cleared of any charge.

=== Ireland ===
Incest is illegal in the Republic of Ireland under the Punishment of Incest Act 1908 (8 Edw. 7. c. 45), which pre-dates the foundation of the state.

It is illegal for a male to have sexual intercourse with his granddaughter, mother, daughter, sister, or half-sister; and for a female (over 16 years of age) with her grandfather, father, son, brother, or half-brother. The act does not refer to other familial relationships (such as grandson-grandmother), or same-sex relations.

Prior to the amendment of the Punishment of Incest Act 1908 in 2019, incest was punishable by up to seven years' imprisonment for a female and up to life imprisonment for a male. The Criminal Law (Sexual Offences) (Amendment) Act 2019 amended the Punishment of Incest Act 1908 to provide for a maximum term of 10 years' imprisonment for both males and females.

Occasionally, offenders convicted of incest will be admitted to a psychiatric hospital for psychiatric treatment.

=== Italy ===
Incest is illegal in Italy only if it provokes public scandal, according to Article 564 of the Penal Code and punishable from two to eight years' imprisonment, open to more years for the older person if the other was under aged. For incest to be a "public scandal" the incest must be done in a blatant manner. The fact that someone reports incest to the authorities does not by itself make it a public scandal.

=== Latvia ===
Incest is not criminally prohibited in Latvia except as part of the general protection of adolescents from sexual abuse.

=== Lithuania ===
Criminal Code of Lithuania does not explicitly foresee a criminal punishment for incest between adults. However, it does state that "A father, mother, guardian, custodian or another lawful representative of a child or a person holding statutory powers in respect of a minor who has sexual intercourse or otherwise satisfied his sexual desires with that minor, in the absence of characteristics of a rape, sexual assault or sexual abuse, shall be punished by a fine or by restriction of liberty or by arrest or by a custodial sentence for a term of up to six years." Thereby, the law explicitly foresees a criminal punishment for incest between a parent and a child or for persons of similar standing.

=== Netherlands ===
Consensual incest between adults is legal in the Netherlands. Marriage is forbidden between ancestors and descendants or between siblings, although the Minister of Justice may grant dispensation in the case of siblings by adoption. Marriage between blood relations of the third and fourth degree are possible, but require both partners to sign a declaration of consent (Dutch civil law book 1, articles 41 and 41a).

=== Norway ===
Incest is illegal in Norway and is defined as intercourse between ancestors and descendants (including adopted descendants), siblings, and even stepfamily. It is punishable by up to six years in prison.

=== Poland ===
In Poland, incest is defined in Article 201 of the Penal Code as sexual intercourse with an ancestor, descendant, guardian, ward, brother, or sister, and is punishable by imprisonment for no less than three months and no more than five years.

=== Portugal ===
In Portugal, incest between consenting adults was decriminalized in 1983, and has remained legal since then.

=== Romania ===
Incest is defined in the Penal Code as "consensual sexual relations between lineal relatives or between siblings" and is punished by a year to five years in prison.

=== Russia ===
In Russia, sexual activity (including incest) between persons who are over the age of consent (16 in Russia) is not a criminal offence.

However, under the Family Code of Russia, persons who are related lineally, siblings, half-siblings, and a stepparent and a stepchild may not marry.

=== Serbia ===
Incest between consenting adults has been decriminalized in Serbia since the adoption of the 2005 Penal Code. Article 197 of the Penal Code prohibits only incest between an adult and a minor relative and between an adult and a minor sibling. Amendments in 2009 increased the penalty from the previous three year prison sentence to a term between 6 months minimum and a 5 year maximum prison sentence.

=== Slovenia ===
Incest in Slovenia is not criminally prohibited unless one person is a minor. A person who has sexual relations with a blood relation minor is punished to two years in prison.

=== Spain ===
Consensual incest is legal in Spain since there is no law against it. However, both parties must be over the age of consent in Spain (16) to have sex.

=== Sweden ===
Intercourse with a descendant or a sibling with is prohibited by law in Sweden.

=== Switzerland ===
Article 213 of the Swiss Criminal Code prohibits incest. Intercourse among siblings or other persons related by blood in direct line is punishable by up to three years' imprisonment. The federal government proposed to abolish this prohibition in 2010, arguing that in the few cases where persons were convicted of incest (three since 1984), other sexual crimes such as child sexual abuse were also committed.

=== Ukraine ===
There appears to be no law prohibiting incest but there is a law restricting it. Article 155 of the criminal code prohibits penetrative sex with anyone under 16. The same article also prohibits incest with a person under 16 with whom one has custodial authority (such as father-minor-daughter).

=== United Kingdom ===
The United Kingdom is a political union of four different countries (England and Wales, Scotland and Northern Ireland), therefore legislation regarding sexual offences in the United Kingdom is devolved. However in each UK nation the relevant legislatures have enacted legislation prohibiting incest, regardless of age, or perceived consent.

False depictions of incest are illegal as well. The Crime and Policing Act 2026 banned pornography in the United Kingdom featuring sexual roleplay involving people pretending to be closely related.

==== England and Wales ====
Incest is illegal in England and Wales under the Sexual Offences Act 2003.

Prohibited degrees of kinship (what constitutes incest) are defined as relationships which involve a person (A) being related to person (B) as either: a parent, grandparent, child, grandchild, brother, sister, half-brother, half-sister, uncle, aunt, nephew or niece.

The act also goes on to include adoptive parents, and their children under the terms of the act, meaning that sexual relations between adoptive parents and their children are still illegal in England and Wales even once their children reach or are over the age of consent.

The act provides a distinction between familial child sex offences (sections 25–29) and sex which occurs between adult relatives (sections 64–65), convictions for the former resulting in a higher sentence.

==== Northern Ireland ====
As is the case in the Republic of Ireland, incest is also illegal in Northern Ireland, as per the Sexual Offences (Northern Ireland) Order 2008 (SI 2008/1769).

==== Scotland ====
In Scotland the offence is against the Criminal Law (Consolidation) (Scotland) Act 1995, the provisions of which effectively replaced the Incest and Related Offences (Scotland) Act 1986 (although the 1986 act was not actually repealed until 2010). Prior to the 1986 act the law was based on the Incest Act 1567 (December c. 15) which incorporated into Scots criminal law Chapter 18 of the Book of Leviticus, using the version of the text of the Geneva Bible of 1562. In January 2016 a petition calling for "Adult Consensual Incest" to be decriminalised was submitted to the Scottish Parliament's Public Petitions Committee, but the petition was not debated and no change was made to the law. In August 2016 and December 2017, further petitions were submitted to the Scottish Parliament's Public Petitions Committee.

== Countries in Oceania that criminalize incest ==
=== Australia ===
In Australia, federal marriage law prohibits marriage and sexual activity between an ancestor and descendant or siblings (including a sibling of half-blood), including those traced through adoption. which also applies to close family members. but what constitutes incest and penalties vary.

In all Australian states and territories except New South Wales, sexual intercourse between a lineal ancestor and a lineal descendant is incest. In New South Wales, incest involves "close family members", which are "parent, son, daughter, sibling (including a half-brother or half-sister), grandparent or grandchild, being such a family member from birth". In Queensland, unlawful incest also includes sexual intercourse between an uncle or aunt with their niece or nephew, although here its application is curtailed by the effect of the federal Marriage Act 1961, as the Queensland Criminal Code states that the crime of incest does not apply to "persons who are lawfully married or entitled to be lawfully married". Thus, it is not incest for a niece aged 16 or over to engage in sexual intercourse with her aunt, or a nephew aged 16 or over to engage in sexual intercourse with his aunt or uncle (the Marriage Act allows same-sex marriage).

In New South Wales, incest is generally only applied in cases where both participants are aged 16 or over (the age of consent in the state). Where a participant is aged between 10 and 16 years of age, the older participant would generally be charged with sexual intercourse with a child under the age of 16, while in cases when a participant is under 10, the older participant would generally be charged with sexual intercourse with a child under the age of 10. In the other states and territories, incest can also arise where one of the parties is below the age of consent, but this does not exclude the possibility of bringing the more general charge of sexual intercourse with a child under the age of 10 (New South Wales and Northern Territory), 12, 13 (Western Australia), 14 (South Australia), 16 or 17 (South Australia and Tasmania) as the case may be. This is particularly relevant where a certain form of sexual conduct between related persons falls outside of the legal definition of incest in a particular jurisdiction.

In no state or territory is consent a defense to incest. The maximum penalty for incest varies: eight years' imprisonment in New South Wales; 10 years' imprisonment in South Australia; 20 years' imprisonment in Western Australia and the Australian Capital Territory; 25 years' imprisonment in the Northern Territory, Victoria, and Tasmania; and life imprisonment in Queensland.

In regards to sex offender registration, any person convicted of incest is required to register as a sex offender seven days after their release from custody: one conviction for incest means an offender is required to comply with reporting obligations for 15 years, while one conviction for incest with a class 2 offence or two or more convictions for incest means an offender is required to comply with reporting obligations for the remainder of their life.

=== Papua New Guinea ===
Incest is illegal in Papua New Guinea.

=== New Zealand ===
In New Zealand, incest is sexual connection between a parent and child (both biological and adopted), grandparent and grandchild (both biological and adopted), and full and half-siblings.

It is a defence if the person was unaware of the relationship at the time of the act (i.e. accidental incest). A conviction for incest attracts a maximum penalty of 10 years' imprisonment. Incest was the only sexual crime punishable by seven years or more imprisonment that was not subject to the country's "three-strikes" law before they were repealed in 2022.

Although the general age of consent for sexual activity is 16 in New Zealand, separate provisions under the law prohibit sexual contact with step-children, foster children and wards, even if they are aged 16 or 17. A conviction for having a sexual connection, or attempting to have a sexual connection, with a dependent child attracts a maximum penalty of seven years' imprisonment.

== See also ==
- Jewish views on incest
- Mahram
