= Afinidad =

Afinidad means affinity in Spanish.

Afinidad (in plural Afinidades) may refer to:

- Afinidad Quartet, a musical quartet led by Edward Simon
- Afinidades (album), an album by Clã and Sérgio Godinho
- Afinidades (film), a 2010 film by Vladimir Cruz
