= Cousin marriage law in the United States =

Laws regarding first-cousin marriage in the States Legal Allowed with requirements Banned with exceptions^{1} Statute bans marriage^{1} Criminal offense^{1}^{1} Some states recognize marriages performed elsewhere, while other states do not.

The legal status of first-cousin marriage varies considerably from one U.S. state to another, ranging from legality in some states to a criminal offense in others. It is illegal or largely illegal in 32 states and legal or largely legal in 18. However, even in the states where it is legal, the practice is not widespread.

== Status and territories ==
Several states of the United States prohibit cousin marriage. As of February 2025, 25 U.S. states prohibit marriages between first cousins, 18 U.S. states allow marriages between first cousins, and seven U.S. states (Arizona, Illinois, Indiana, Maine, Minnesota, Utah, Wisconsin) allow only some marriages between first cousins. North Carolina allows first cousin marriage as long as the applicants for marriage are not rare double first cousins, meaning cousins through both parental lines. First cousin marriage is a criminal offense in eight states (Arizona, Nevada, North Dakota, Oklahoma, South Dakota, Texas, Utah, Wisconsin). Six states (Kentucky, Nevada, Ohio, Tennessee, Utah, Washington, Wisconsin) prohibit first-cousin-once-removed marriages. Marriages between second cousins are legal in all 50 states. New York is the only state that allows avunculate marriage (uncle/aunt-niece/nephew marriage) generally. Rhode Island generally prohibits avunculate marriage, but makes an exception for Jewish marriages conducted within the bounds permitted by Jewish religious law. Some states prohibiting cousin marriage recognize cousin marriages performed in other states, but despite occasional claims that this holds true in general, laws also exist that explicitly void all foreign cousin marriages or marriages conducted by state residents out of state.

| State or territory | First cousin marriage allowed | First cousin marriage criminalized | Sexual relations or cohabitation allowed | First-cousin marriages void | Out-of-state marriages by state's residents void | All out-of-state marriages void | First-cousin-once-removed marriage allowed | Half-cousin marriage allowed | Adopted-cousin marriage allowed |
|---|---|---|---|---|---|---|---|---|---|
| Alabama | Yes | No | Yes | No | No | No | Yes | Yes | Yes |
| Alaska | Yes | No | Yes | No | No | No | Yes | Yes | Yes |
| Arizona | Only if both parties are 65 or older, or if one of the parties is infertile | Yes | No | Yes | Yes | Yes | Yes | Yes | Yes |
| Arkansas | No | No | Yes | Yes | No | No | Yes | Unknown | Unknown |
| California | Yes | No | Yes | No | No | No | Yes | Yes | Yes |
| Colorado | Yes | No | Yes | No | No | No | Yes | Yes | Yes |
| Connecticut | Yes | No | Yes | No | No | No | Yes | Yes | Yes |
| Delaware | No | No | Yes | Yes | Yes | Unknown | Yes | Unknown | Unknown |
| Florida | Yes | No | Yes | No | No | No | Yes | Yes | Yes |
| Georgia | Yes | No | Yes | No | No | No | Yes | Yes | Yes |
| Hawaii | Yes | No | Yes | No | No | No | Yes | Yes | Yes |
| Idaho | No | No | Yes | Unknown | Unknown | Unknown | Yes | Unknown | Unknown |
| Illinois | Only if both parties are 50 or older, or if one of the parties is infertile | No | Yes | No | No | No | Yes | Only if both parties are 50 or older, or if one of the parties is infertile | Yes |
| Indiana | Only if both parties are 65 or older | No | Yes | Yes | No | No | Yes | Yes | Yes |
| Iowa | No | No | Yes | Yes | Unknown | No | Yes | Unknown | Unknown |
| Kansas | No | No | Yes | Yes | Yes | Yes | Yes | Yes | Unknown |
| Kentucky | No | No | No | Yes | Yes | Yes | No | No | No |
| Louisiana | No | No | Yes | Yes | Unknown | No | Yes | No | If judicial approval in writing is obtained |
| Maine | Either if the parties have the same sex or if the parties have a proof of genetic counseling from a genetic counselor | No | Yes | No | No | No | Yes | Unknown | Yes |
| Maryland | Yes | No | Yes | No | No | No | Yes | Yes | Yes |
| Massachusetts | Yes | No | Yes | No | No | No | Yes | Yes | Yes |
| Michigan | No | No | It is a felony to engage in sexual conduct with a cousin who is mentally disabled, incapable, or incapacitated, physically helpless, or developmentally disabled due to autism, cerebral palsy, epilepsy, or intellectual disability | Yes | No | No | Yes | Unknown | Unknown |
| Minnesota | Only marriages between aboriginals | No | Yes | Yes | Unknown | Unknown | Yes | Only marriages between aboriginals | Yes |
| Mississippi | No | No | No | Yes | Yes | Unknown | Yes | Unknown | Yes |
| Missouri | No | No | Yes | Yes | Unknown | Unknown | Yes | Unknown | Unknown |
| Montana | No | No | Yes | Yes | Unknown | Unknown | Yes | Yes | Unknown |
| Nebraska | No | No | Yes | Yes | No | No | Yes | Yes | Yes |
| Nevada | No | Yes | No | Yes | Unknown | Unknown | No | Yes | Unknown |
| New Hampshire | No | No | Yes | Yes | Yes | Yes | Yes | Unknown | No |
| New Jersey | Yes | No | Yes | No | No | No | Yes | Yes | Yes |
| New Mexico | Yes | No | Yes | No | No | No | Yes | Yes | Yes |
| New York | Yes | No | Yes | No | No | No | Yes | Yes | Yes |
| North Carolina | Yes, except in the rare case of double first cousins | No | Yes | Yes, but cannot be declared void after all of cohabitation, birth of issue, and death of one of the parties has occurred | No | No | Yes | Yes | Yes |
| North Dakota | No | Yes | No | Yes | Yes | No | Yes | No | Unknown |
| Ohio | No | No | Yes | No | No | No | No | Unknown | Unknown |
| Oklahoma | No | Yes | Yes | Yes | No | No | Yes | Yes | Unknown |
| Oregon | No | No | Yes | Yes | No | No | Yes | Yes | Yes |
| Pennsylvania | No | No | Yes | Yes | Unknown | Unknown | Yes | Unknown | Unknown |
| Rhode Island | Yes | No | Yes | No | No | No | Yes | Yes | Yes |
| South Carolina | Yes | No | Yes | No | No | No | Yes | Yes | Yes |
| South Dakota | No | Yes | No | Yes | No | No | Yes | Yes | Unknown |
| Tennessee | No | No | Yes | Yes | No | No | Only if the parties have the same sex | Only if the parties have the same sex | Yes |
| Texas | No | Yes | No | No | No | No | Yes | No | No |
| Utah | Only if both parties are 65 or older, or both are 55 or older and one of the parties is infertile | Yes | No | Yes | Yes | Yes | Only if both parties are 65 or older, or both are 55 or older and one of the parties is infertile | Only if both parties are 65 or older, or both are 55 or older and one of the parties is infertile | Unknown |
| Vermont | Yes | No | Yes | No | No | No | Yes | Yes | Yes |
| Virginia | Yes | No | Yes | No | No | No | Yes | Yes | Yes |
| Washington | No | No | Yes | Yes | No | No | No | No | No |
| West Virginia | No | No | Yes | Unknown | Unknown | Unknown | Yes | No | Yes |
| Wisconsin | Only if any woman in the parties is at least 55 (two male first cousins can always marry), or if one of the parties is infertile | Yes | No | Yes | Yes | No | Only if any woman in the parties is at least 55 (two male first cousins once removed can always marry), or if one of the parties is infertile | Yes | Yes |
| Wyoming | No | No | Yes | Yes | No | No | Yes | Unknown | Yes |
| American Samoa | Yes | | | | | | | | |
| District of Columbia | Yes | No | Yes | No | No | No | Yes | Yes | Yes |
| Guam | No | | | | | | | | |
| Northern Mariana Islands | Unknown | | | | | | | | |
| Puerto Rico | Yes | | | | | | | | |
| U.S. Virgin Islands | Yes | | | | | | | | |

== Incidence ==
Data on cousin marriage in the United States are sparse. It was estimated in 1960 that 0.2% of all marriages between Roman Catholics were between first or second cousins, but no more recent nationwide studies have been performed. Even then the frequently cited 0.2% estimate lacks strong empirical grounding because no nationwide survey or systematic dataset of cousin marriages among U.S. Catholics was conducted. It is unknown what proportion of that number were first cousins, which is the group facing marriage bans.

Some studies have cast doubt on whether offspring of first cousins are at as significant of a health risk as is popularly assumed. However, professors Diane B. Paul and Hamish G. Spencer speculate that legal bans persist in part due to "the ease with which a handful of highly motivated activists — or even one individual — can be effective in the decentralized American system, especially when feelings do not run high on the other side of an issue."

== History ==
Cousin marriage was legal in all states before the Civil War. Anthropologist Martin Ottenheimer suggests (1996) that marriage prohibitions were introduced to maintain the social order, uphold religious morality, and safeguard the creation of fit offspring. Writers such as Noah Webster (1758–1843) and ministers like Philip Milledoler (1775–1852) and Joshua McIlvaine helped lay the groundwork for such viewpoints well before 1860. This led to a gradual shift in concern from affinal unions, like those between a man and his deceased wife's sister (see widow inheritance), to consanguineous unions. By the 1870s, Lewis Henry Morgan (1818–1881) was writing about "the advantages of marriages between unrelated persons" and the necessity of avoiding "the evils of consanguine marriage", avoidance of which would "increase the vigor of the stock". To many, Morgan included, cousin marriage, and more specifically parallel-cousin marriage was a remnant of a more primitive stage of human social organization. Morgan himself had married his cousin in 1853.

In 1846, Massachusetts Governor George N. Briggs appointed a commission to study mentally handicapped people (at the time termed "idiots") in the state. This study implicated cousin marriage as responsible for idiocy. Within the next two decades, numerous reports (e.g., one from the Kentucky Deaf and Dumb Asylum) appeared with similar conclusions: that cousin marriage sometimes resulted in deafness, blindness, and idiocy. Perhaps most important was the report of physician Samuel Merrifield Bemiss for the American Medical Association, which concluded cousin inbreeding leads to the "physical and mental deprivation of the offspring". Despite being contradicted by other studies like those of George Darwin (himself the result of a cousin marriage) and Alan Huth in England and Robert Newman in New York, the report's conclusions were widely accepted.

These developments led to thirteen states and territories passing cousin marriage prohibitions by the 1880s. Though contemporaneous, the eugenics movement did not play much of a direct role in the bans. George Louis Arner in 1908 considered the ban a clumsy and ineffective method of eugenics, which he thought would eventually be replaced by more refined techniques. By the 1920s, the number of states banning cousin marriage had doubled. Since that time, Kentucky (1943) and Texas have banned first-cousin marriage and since 1985, Maine has mandated genetic counseling for marrying cousins to minimize risk to any serious health defect to their children. The National Conference of Commissioners on Uniform State Laws unanimously recommended in 1970 that all such laws should be repealed, but as of 2008 no state had dropped its prohibition.

In 2024, Tennessee banned first cousin marriage. (Tenn. Code Ann. § 36-3-101)

In 2024, a vote to block marriage between cousins in Florida failed to pass.

== Proposed changes ==
A bill to repeal the ban on first-cousin marriage in Minnesota was introduced by Phyllis Kahn in 2003, but it died in committee. Republican Minority Leader Marty Seifert criticized the bill in response, saying it would "turn us into a cold Arkansas". According to the University of Minnesota's The Wake, Kahn was aware the bill had little chance of passing but introduced it anyway to draw attention to the issue. She reportedly got the idea after learning that cousin marriage is an acceptable form of marriage among some cultural groups that have a strong presence in Minnesota, namely the Hmong and Somali.

In contrast, Maryland delegates Henry B. Heller and Kumar P. Barve sponsored a bill to ban first-cousin marriages in 2000. It got further than Kahn's bill, passing the House of Delegates by 82 to 46 despite most Republicans voting no, but finally died in the state senate. In response to the 2005 marriage of Pennsylvanian first cousins Eleanor Amrhein and Donald W. Andrews Sr. in Maryland, Heller said that he might resurrect the bill because such marriages are "like playing genetic roulette".

Texas did pass a ban on first-cousin marriage the same year as Amrhein and Andrews married, evidently in reaction to the presence of the polygamous Fundamentalist Church of Jesus Christ of Latter-Day Saints (FLDS). Texas Representative Harvey Hilderbran, whose district includes the main FLDS compound, authored an amendment to a child protection statute to both discourage the FLDS from settling in Texas and to "prevent Texas from succumbing to the practices of taking child brides, incest, welfare abuse, and domestic violence". While Hilderbran stated that he would not have authored a bill solely to ban first-cousin marriage, he also said in an interview, "Cousins don't get married just like siblings don't get married. And when it happens you have a bad result. It's just not the accepted normal thing."

Some news sources then only mentioned the polygamy and child abuse provisions and ignored the cousin marriage portion of the bill, as did some more recent sources. The new statute made sex with an adult first cousin a more serious felony than with adult members of one's immediate family. However, this statute was amended in 2009; while sex with close adult family members (including first cousins) remains a felony, the more serious penalty now attaches to sex with an individual's direct ancestor or descendant.

The U.S. state of Maine allows first-cousin marriage if the couple agrees to have genetic counseling, while North Carolina allows it so long as the applicants for marriage are not rare double first cousins, meaning cousins through both parental lines. In the other 25 states permitting at least some first-cousin marriage, double cousins are not distinguished.

States have various laws regarding marriage between cousins and other close relatives, which involve factors including whether or not the parties to the marriage are half-cousins, double cousins, infertile, over 65, or whether it is a tradition prevalent in a native or ancestry culture, adoption status, in-law, whether or not genetic counseling is required, and whether it is permitted to marry a first cousin once removed.

== See also ==
- Avunculate marriage
- Consanguine marriage
- Cousin marriage court cases in the United States
- Laws regarding incest in the United States
- Sibling marriage
