= Rel =

Rel or REL may mean:

== Science and technology ==
- REL, a human gene
- the rel descriptor of stereochemistry, see Relative configuration
- REL (Rassemblement Européen pour la Liberté), European Rally for Liberty, a defunct French far-right party active in the 1960s
- Category of relations or Rel, a mathematical category of sets and relations
- Rel attribute, an HTML attribute for indicating a semantic link
- Recommended Exposure Limit, a recommended limit for occupational exposures published by the National Institute for Occupational Safety and Health
- Rights Expression Language, a machine-processable language used for digital rights management

== People ==
- Rel Dowdell, American screenwriter, film director, film producer, and English/screenwriting educator
- Nickname of Arielle Gold, American world champion and Olympic bronze medalist snowboarder
- Rel Hunt (born 1974), Australian actor
- Nickname of Ariel Schulman (born 1981), American actor, film director, and producer
- Robert E. Lee, Confederate general.

== Other uses ==
- Rel (TV series), a 2018 American television sitcom
- Rel (time), a fictional Dalek unit of measurement; oftentimes depicted as a measurement of time, but originally used as a measurement of hydroelectricity
- Magic: The Gathering Organized Play Rules Enforcement Level
- Reaction Engines Limited, a British aerospace company
- Religare Enterprises Limited, an Indian holding company
- Almirante Marcos A. Zar Airport IATA code
- Rendille language ISO 639-3 language code, spoken in Kenya

== See also ==
- Ex rel, abbreviation of Latin ex relatione
- Relative (disambiguation)
- Rell (disambiguation)
