= Relatives =

Relatives can refer to:

- Kinship
- Relatives (1985 film), a 1985 Australian movie
- Relatives (2006 film), a 2006 Hungarian movie
- "Relatives", a song by Irving Berlin
- The Relatives, a 2021 film
- The Relatives (album), a 2005 album by Jeff Parker
- The Relatives (band), American band

== See also ==
- Relative (disambiguation)
