= List of cousin marriage court cases in the United States =

The following is a list of United States court cases on cousin marriage. Currently only certain cases at the appellate level in the last sixty years are listed.

== Case law ==
| Name | Date | Forum | Description |
|---|---|---|---|
| Ex parte Bowen | March 21, 1952 | Court of Appeals of Kentucky (Note: At the time of this decision, the Court of Appeals was Kentucky's only appellate body. Following a 1975 state constitutional amendment, the Court of Appeals became an intermediate body under the new Supreme Court of Kentucky.) | Held that due to the new Kentucky statute, the marriage was void and the veterans benefits should be denied to the spouse. |
| Matter of the Estate of Martin Emil Mortenson, deceased | October 29, 1957 | Supreme Court of Arizona | Cousin marriage not recognized because Arizona statutes declare the marriage "void" unless it was recognized in the place where solemnized, with the parties having resided in that place. In this case, the parties resided in Arizona and left to have the marriage solemnized in New Mexico. Wife received no share of the estate. |
| Mazzolini v. Mazzolini | December 24, 1958 | Supreme Court of Ohio | Held that because it was not declared void in statute, a cousin marriage solemnized elsewhere was valid in Ohio. Annulment not granted. |
| In re the Marriage of Earl E. Adams | December 31, 1979 | Supreme Court of Montana | Held that a first cousin marriage in Montana, where it was prohibited and where the courts were bound to declare it as void, was indeed void. The wife received no portion of the estate. |
| In the Matter of the Estate of Owen C. Loughmiller, Deceased | June 10, 1981 | Supreme Court of Kansas | Found that a marriage entered into outside the state of Kansas was valid because there is no statute in Kansas specifically voiding the marriage. The marriage was found valid and the separation agreement between the two parties was upheld. |
| Etheridge v. Shaddock | April 7, 1986 | Supreme Court of Arkansas | Found that a cousin marriage performed elsewhere was legal in Arkansas. A disputed change in child custody rights was therefore denied. Incidentally, it noted that a marriage between other closer relatives would not be recognized in this situation. |
| Cook v. Cook | January 13, 2005 | Court of Appeals of Arizona, Division 1, Department A | Found that a cousin marriage performed elsewhere should be recognized because Arizona law at the time expressly directed such recognition, and although it was amended after the marriage, retroactive application of the law was not called for. Consequently, dissolution of the marriage was not granted. |

== See also ==
- Cousin marriage law in the United States by state
