= Cases of Stübing v. Germany =

German man in a relationship with his sister

The Cases of Stübing v. Germany involve a series of criminal prosecutions and appeals surrounding Patrick Stübing and Susan Karolewski, two German siblings who have had four children in an incestuous relationship with each other. Stübing has served several prison sentences for violating German laws prohibiting sexual intercourse between siblings, and Karolewski has been held under supervision for the same. The couple have been allowed to keep only their fourth child. Stübing eventually obtained a vasectomy. Their case has featured in public debate about whether sibling sexual relations should be decriminalised in Germany.

== Background ==
Stübing, a locksmith, was born in 1976 at Leipzig, East Germany, the second of five children. He was taken into state care at age three after being attacked by his alcoholic father, was adopted at age seven by his foster parents, and grew up in Potsdam. Karolewski was born in 1984. Stübing met his mother, who had separated from his father and had a new partner, and his sister in 2000, when he was 23 and Karolewski was 16. According to Stübing, the relationship between him and his sister became incestuous after their mother died suddenly in December 2000. Their other siblings have died.

== Incestuous relationship and legal sentences ==
Karolewski, who has a personality disorder which the court determined left her "only partially liable" for her actions, gave birth to their first child in October 2001. A social worker reported suspicions of incest and Stübing received a suspended sentence in 2002. Karolewski subsequently gave birth to two more children; at Stübing's second trial, in 2004, she was accused as his co-defendant because the second child was conceived after her 18th birthday. He was sentenced to 10 months in prison, and she was put under the supervision of a social worker but not convicted due to her personality disorder. Neither was assigned a lawyer; Stübing appealed the verdict. By November 2006, he had served the time and been released.

The couple's first two children are slightly mentally and physically disabled; the third was born with a heart defect that was corrected with surgery. All three were placed in foster care. Karolewski's fourth child, a daughter born in 2005, was born healthy and was not taken from her. At a third trial in 2005, she was again placed under supervision of a social worker and not convicted of anything, while Stübing was sentenced to 14 months in prison. His lawyer appealed to the Federal Constitutional Court; Stübing's appeal was denied in March 2008, and in April 2012 he lost an appeal to the European Court of Human Rights under Article 8 of the European Convention on Human Rights (Right to respect for private and family life).

In 2004, Stübing underwent a voluntary vasectomy. After his third imprisonment ended, the couple resumed living together, but by 2012 they had split up. A 2012 article in the Austrian newspaper Kleine Zeitung reported as follows:

The sister and ex-girlfriend of Patrick S., who was convicted of incest, said in an interview: "It's okay that incest is punishable. I feel guilty about it. I used to be young and somehow longed for love. But I would never do that again. I wouldn't advise anyone to do that either. I don't want to have anything to do with Patrick anymore."

== Legal issues ==
Under paragraph 173 of the German criminal code, sexual relations between close relatives are illegal and punishable by up to three years in prison. However, most cases of incest are instead prosecuted as child abuse.

In 2014, in response to the case of Stübing and Karolewski, the German Ethics Council voted in favour of decriminalising consensual incest between siblings, while the CDU party of then-Chancellor Angela Merkel opposed abolition of the law. Legality of incest between adult biological siblings is not always treated the same as other kinds of incest such as between adult cousins or between parents and their adult children, and laws have been amended in the case of consensual adult incestuous relationships in Brazil, France, Japan, and Turkey.
