= Relative =

Relative may refer to:

== General use ==
- Kinship and family, the principle binding the most basic social units of society. If two people are connected by circumstances of birth, they are said to be relatives.

== Philosophy ==
- Relativism, the concept that points of view have no absolute truth or validity, having only relative, subjective value according to differences in perception and consideration, or relatively, as in the relative value of an object to a person
- Relative value (philosophy)

== Economics ==
- Relative value (economics)

== Popular culture ==
=== Film and television ===
- Relatively Speaking (1965 play), 1965 British play
- Relatively Speaking (game show), late 1980s television game show
- Everything's Relative (episode)#Yu-Gi-Oh! (Yu-Gi-Oh! Duel Monsters), 2000 Japanese anime Yu-Gi-Oh! Duel Monsters episode
- Relative Values, 2000 film based on the play of the same name.
- It's All Relative, 2003-4 comedy television series
- Intelligence is Relative, tag line for the 2008 film Burn After Reading
- Relative (film), a 2022 drama/comedy feature film

=== Literature ===
- The Relativity of Wrong, 1988 Isaac Asimov essay
- Relative Heroes, 2000 DC comic book series
- Time and Relative, 2001 Doctor Who book
- Relative Dementias, 2002 Doctor Who book series

=== Music ===
- Friends & Relatives, 1999 compilation album
- Dead Relatives, 2000 music album by Canadian Emm Gryner
- Relative Ways, 2001 music album by ...And You Will Know Us by the Trail of Dead
- "Relative", a 2008 song by Gavin DeGraw from his eponymous self-titled album

== See also ==
- Rel (disambiguation)
- Relation (disambiguation)
- Relatives (disambiguation)
- Relativity (disambiguation)
