= Affinity (Catholic canon law) =

Concept in impediments to marriage

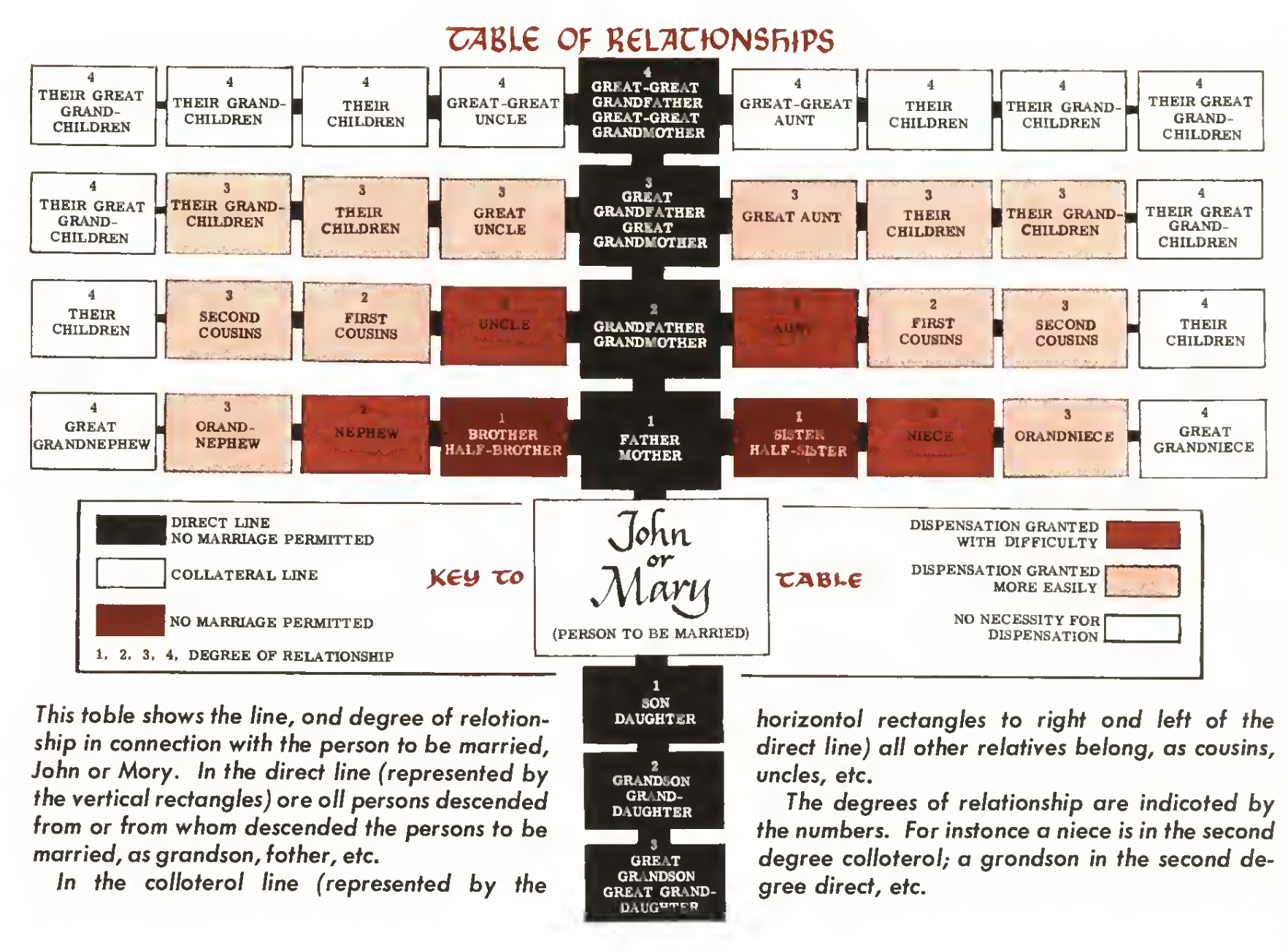
A diagram in a Catholic children's catechism shows degrees of consanguinity and the impediments they pose to marriage.

In Catholic canon law, affinity is an impediment to marriage of a couple due to the relationship which either party has as a result of a kinship relationship created by another marriage or as a result of extramarital intercourse. The relationships that give rise to the impediment have varied over time. Marriages and sexual relations between people in an affinity relationship are regarded as incest.

Today, the relevant principle within the Catholic Church is that "affinity does not beget affinity"—i.e., there is no affinity between one spouse's relatives and the other spouse's relatives. Canon 109 of the Code of Canon Law of the Catholic Church provides that affinity is an impediment to the marriage of a couple, and is a relationship which "arises from a valid marriage, even if not consummated, and exists between a man and the blood relatives of the woman and between the woman and the blood relatives of the man." Also, affinity "is reckoned in such a way that the blood relations of the man are related by affinity to the woman in the same line and the same degree, and vice versa."

== Historical development ==
=== Mosaic law ===
In the Hebrew Bible, Leviticus 18:8–18 and 20:11–21 contain prohibitions of sexual relations between a couple in a consanguineous relationship, as well as a number of prohibitions of certain affinity relationships, e.g., Leviticus 18:8 (father's wife), 18:14 (father's brother's wife), 18:16 (brother's wife), 18:18 (wife's sister), 20:11–12 (father's wife, daughter-in-law), 20:14 (woman and her mother), 20:19 (sister of either one's mother or father) and 20:21 (brother's wife). Marriage to a brother's widow is prohibited, but not to a deceased wife's sister. However, as an exception, Deuteronomy 25:5–10 permitted a brother to marry his brother's widow if the brother died without issue, in a so-called levirate marriage.

=== Roman law ===
Roman civil law prohibited marriages within four degrees of consanguinity but had no degrees of affinity with regards to marriage. However, the rule was that, if an issue of affinity arose, at whatever consanguineal level a couple was joined was considered the same level as regarded affinity. Roman civil laws prohibited any marriage between parents and children, either in the ascending or descending line ad infinitum. Adoption was considered the same as affinity in that an adoptive father could not marry an unemancipated daughter or granddaughter even if the adoption had been dissolved. Slaves, as such, could not contract a legal marriage, but if freed were then subject to the general rules. Also, if contracted bona fide, out of ignorance of any impediment, a marriage that was contracted within the prohibited degrees of consanguinity or affinity was permitted to stand and any children thereof were considered legitimate.

=== Historical Catholic canon law ===
Regarding itself as not being bound by Old Testament commandments, the early Christian church followed Roman civil law, as the law of the land. The Christian emperors modified the rules from time to time and extended the civil law impediment to the first degree of collateral affinity. The church extended the impediment to relationships created by illicit intercourse. The Council of Elvira (c. 300), prohibited the marriage of a widower with his deceased wife's sister. The prohibition became slowly more extensive. By the early 9th century, the Western Church had increased the number of prohibited degrees of consanguinity from four to seven. The method of calculating relationships was also changed to simply count the number of generations back to a common ancestor. The church also prohibited affinity to the same seven degrees. While the impediment of affinity is close to but not as compelling as that of consanguinity, the reasoning behind the prohibited degrees of affinity being treated the same as that of consanguinity is the nearness to the blood relatives by the very act of sexual intercourse.

Prior to the Fourth Council of the Lateran (1215), the Church recognized two additional forms of affinity. Firstly, when a man married a widow, her relatives as well as those of her former husband were considered the man's relatives and treated as if they were his blood relatives. Secondly, if the woman's first husband had been a widower then the blood relatives of his first wife became the woman's relatives and, by her subsequent marriage, were also the new husband's relatives by affinity. Also, a woman's children by a deceased husband, as well as the children of her husband by a deceased wife, were considered related by affinity. So the subsequent marriages of step-siblings carried the same prohibitions as if they were related by blood. The principle established was "affinity begot affinity."

The Fourth Lateran Council removed the second type of affinity rule and the new axiom became: "affinity does not beget affinity", which is the principle followed in the modern Catholic Church. It also limited both affinity and consanguinity prohibitions to the fourth degree, but retained the same method of calculating, counting back to a common ancestor. The Council of Trent (1545–1563) limited the impediment to marriage on account of affinity in cases when the affinity is created outside of marriage (e.g., by force or extra-matrimonial intercourse) to the second degree of affinity.

=== Dispensation ===
As the affinity rules have their origin in ecclesiastical and not divine law, impediments can be dispensed by the competent Church authority. The Pope or a bishop may grant a dispensation to a marriage when the affinity rules would be breached.

== Contemporary Christian positions ==
The current canon law of the Latin Church holds in Canon 1092 that affinity in any degree of the direct line invalidates marriage, such as between a father-in-law and his daughter-in-law, or between a mother-in-law and her son-in-law. However, the code does not prohibit marriages between people related by affinity in the collateral line, allowing a widow or widower to marry the sibling or first cousin of their deceased spouse. The Code of Canons of the Eastern Churches of the Eastern Catholic Church holds in Canon 809 that affinity invalidates marriage in the direct line in any degree, and also in the collateral line to the second degree, thus prohibiting someone from marrying their sibling-in-law without first receiving a dispensation.

The modern laws of the Anglican Church regarding affinity are found in the Book of Common Prayer, which were revised from time to time. The Deceased Wife's Sister's Marriage Act 1907 removed the impediment to marrying a late wife's sister. Restrictions were also relaxed by the Marriage Act 1949 s. 1 and the Marriage (Prohibited Degrees of Relationship) Act 1986 s. 1. The Anglican Communion allows marriages beyond the second degree of affinity.

The Eastern Orthodox Church relationship prohibitions because of affinity follow Leviticus 18:8 (father's wife), 18:14 (father's brother's wife), 18:16 (brother's wife), 18:18 (wife's sister), 20:11–12 (father's wife, daughter-in-law), 20:14 (woman and her mother), 20:19 (sister of either one's mother or father) and 20:21 (brother's wife). However, the Greek patriarchs and bishops may grant dispensations with a certain degree of freedom or choose to adhere to the letter of the law. The Church of the East has few restrictions on affinity begetting affinity. The Armenian Apostolic Church restricts affinity to the fourth degree, while the policy of Oriental Orthodoxy in general is very close to that of the Roman Catholic canons. Conservative Lutherans also prohibit marriage within close degrees of affinity, even if not specifically outlawed by the state.

== See also ==
- Affinity (law)
- Consanguinity
