= Affinity (law) =

Legal and anthropological concept

In law and in cultural anthropology, affinity is the kinship relationship created or that exists between two people as a result of someone's marriage. It is the relationship each party in the marriage has to the family of the other party in the marriage. It does not cover the marital relationship itself.

Laws, traditions and customs relating to affinity vary considerably, sometimes ceasing with the death of one of the marriage partners through whom affinity is traced, and sometimes with the divorce of the marriage partners. In addition to kinship by marriage, "affinity" can sometimes also include kinship by adoption or a step relationship.

Unlike blood relationships (consanguinity), which may have genetic consequences, affinity is essentially a social or moral construct, at times backed by legal consequences.

In law, affinity may be relevant in relation to prohibitions on incestuous sexual relations and in relation to whether particular couples are prohibited from marrying. Which relationships are prohibited vary from jurisdiction to jurisdiction, and have varied over time. In some countries, especially in the past, the prohibited relationships were based on religious laws. In some countries, the prohibition on sexual relations between persons in an affinity relationship may be expressed in terms of degrees of relationship. The degree of affinity is considered the same as the consanguineal level of the couple that was joined, so that, for example, the degree of affinity of a husband to his sister-in-law is two, the same as the wife would be to her sister on the basis of consanguinity. The degree to the wife’s parent or child is one, and to an aunt or niece it is three, and first cousin it is four. Though adoption and step relationships are cases of affinity, they are normally treated as consanguinity.

== Terminology ==
In law, affinity relatives by marriage are known as affines.

More commonly, they are known as in-laws or family-in-law, with affinity being usually signified by adding "-in-law" to a degree of kinship. This is standard for the closest degrees of kinship, such as parent-in-law, child-in-law, sibling-in-law, etc., but is frequently omitted in the case of more extended relations. As uncle and aunt are frequently used to refer indifferently to unrelated friends of the family, the terms may be used without specifying whether the person is a cognate or affine. Similarly, the spouse of a cousin may not be called a relation at all or may be referenced as a "cousin by marriage". "By-marriage" can also be used with "uncle" or "aunt", e.g. Princess Léa of Belgium is an aunt by marriage of King Philippe of Belgium.

== Examples ==
In South Africa, sexual relations are prohibited within the first degree of affinity, that is, where one person is the direct ancestor or descendant of the spouse of the other person.

Brazilian law, by the Article 1521 of the Civil Code, also extends the invalidity of marriage between parents and children to grandparents and grandchildren or any other sort of ascendant-descendant relationship (both consanguineous and adoptive), parents-in-law and children-in-law even after the divorce of the earlier couple, as well as to stepparents and stepchildren, and former spouses to an adoptive parent who did this unilaterally (regarded as an equivalent, in families formed by adoption, to stepparents and stepchildren); and extends the invalidity of marriage between siblings to biological cousin-siblings.

In Hawaii, sexual penetration and marriage is prohibited within close degrees of affinity and is punishable by up to 5 years.

In Michigan, sexual contact between persons related "by blood or affinity to the third degree," and who are not lawfully married to each other, are chargeable as criminal sexual conduct in the 4th degree and punishable by a 2-year sentence or a fine of up to $500 or both.

In New Jersey, sexual contact is prohibited when the actor is "related to the victim by blood or affinity to the 3rd degree" and the victim is at least 16 but less than 18 years old.

== See also ==
- Affinity (Catholic canon law)
- Alliance theory
- Consanguinity
- Kinship
- Prohibited degree of kinship
