= Relativity =

Relativity may refer to:

== Physics ==
- Galilean relativity, Galileo's conception of relativity
- Numerical relativity, a subfield of computational physics that aims to establish numerical solutions to Einstein's field equations in general relativity
- Principle of relativity, used in Einstein's theories and derived from Galileo's principle
- Theory of relativity, a general treatment that refers to both special relativity and general relativity
  - General relativity, Albert Einstein's theory of gravitation
  - Special relativity, a theory formulated by Albert Einstein, Henri Poincaré, and Hendrik Lorentz
  - Relativity: The Special and the General Theory, a 1920 book by Albert Einstein

== Social sciences ==
- Linguistic relativity
- Cultural relativity
- Moral relativity

== Arts and entertainment ==
=== Music ===
- Relativity Music Group, a Universal subsidiary record label for releasing film soundtracks
- Relativity Records, an American record label
- Relativity (band), a Scots-Irish traditional music quartet 1985–1987
- Relativity (Emarosa album), 2008
- Relativity (Indecent Obsession album), 1993
- Relativity (Walt Dickerson album) or the title song, 1962
- Relativity, an EP by Grafton Primary, 2007

=== Television ===
- Relativity (TV series), a 1996–1997 American drama series
- "Relativity" (Farscape), an episode
- "Relativity" (Star Trek: Voyager), an episode

=== Other ===
- Relativity (M. C. Escher), a 1953 lithograph print by M. C. Escher
- Relativity Media, an American film production company

== Business ==
- Relativity Space, an American aerospace manufacturing company

== See also ==
- Relative (disambiguation)
- Relativism, a family of philosophical, religious, and social views
