= Consanguinity =

Property of being from the same kinship as another person

One legal definition of degrees of consanguinity. The number next to each box in the table indicates the degree of relationship relative to the given person.

Consanguinity (from Latin cōnsanguinitās 'blood relationship, kinship') is the characteristic of having a kinship with a relative who is descended from a common ancestor.

Many jurisdictions have laws prohibiting people who are closely related by blood from marrying or having sexual relations with each other. The degree of consanguinity that gives rise to this prohibition varies from place to place. On the other hand, around 20% of the global population lives in areas where some consanguinous marriages are preferred. The degree of relationships are also used to determine heirs of an estate according to statutes that govern intestate succession, which also vary from jurisdiction to jurisdiction. In some communities and time periods, cousin marriage is allowed or even encouraged; in others, it is taboo, and considered to be incest.

The degree of relative consanguinity can be illustrated with a consanguinity table in which each level of lineal consanguinity (generation or meiosis) appears as a row, and individuals with a collaterally consanguineous relationship share the same row. The Knot System is a numerical notation that describes consanguinity using the Ahnentafel numbers of shared ancestors.

== Legal definitions ==
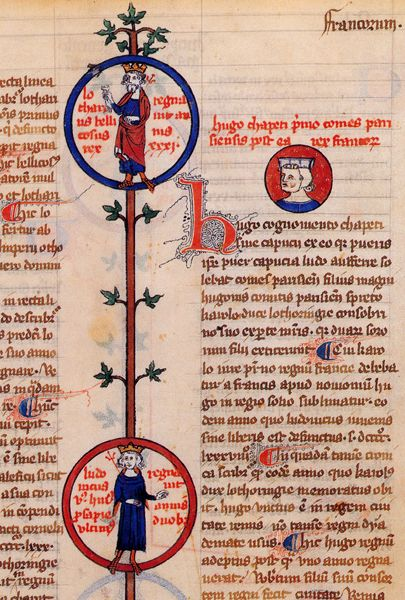
Consanguinity of the kings of France as shown in Arbor genealogiae regum Francorum (Bernard Gui, early 14th century)

=== Modern secular law ===
The degree of kinship between two people may give rise to several legal issues. Some laws prohibit sexual relations between closely related people, referred to as incestuous. Laws may also bar marriage between closely related people, which are almost universally prohibited to the second degree of consanguinity. Some jurisdictions forbid marriage between first cousins, while others do not. Marriage with aunts and uncles (avunculate marriage) is legal in several countries.

Consanguinity is also relevant to inheritance, particularly with regard to intestate succession. In general, laws tend to favor inheritance by persons closely related to the deceased. Some jurisdictions ban citizens from service on a jury on the basis of consanguinity as well as affinity with persons involved in the case. In many countries, laws prohibiting nepotism ban employment of, or certain kinds of contracts with, the near relations of public officers or employees.

=== Religious and traditional law ===
==== Judaism ====
The relationships prohibited by Leviticus 18 are:

- One's mother (Leviticus 18:7)
- One's father (Leviticus 18:7)
- One's stepmother (Leviticus 18:8)
- One's paternal or maternal sister (Leviticus 18:9)
- One's paternal sister through one's father's wife (Leviticus 18:11)
- One's daughter (inferred from Leviticus 18:10)
- One's granddaughter (Leviticus 18:10)
- A woman and her daughter (Leviticus 18:17)
- A woman and her granddaughter (Leviticus 18:17)
- One's aunt by blood (Leviticus 18:12–13)
- One's father's brother (uncle) (Leviticus 18:14)
- One's father's brother's wife (aunt) (Leviticus 18:14)
- One's daughter-in-law (Leviticus 18:15)
- One's brother's wife (sister-in-law) (Leviticus 18:16), with the exception of Yibum
- One's wife's sister (sister-in-law) during one's wife's lifetime, even if since divorced (Leviticus 18:18)

==== Christianity ====
Under Roman civil law, which the early canon law of the Catholic Church followed, couples were forbidden to marry if they were within four degrees of consanguinity. Around the ninth century, the church raised the number of prohibited degrees to seven and changed the method by which they were calculated; instead of the former Roman practice of counting each generational link up to the common ancestor and then down again to the proposed spouse, the new method computed consanguinity only by counting back the number of generations to the common ancestor. Intermarriage was now prohibited to anyone more closely related than seventh cousins, which meant that in particular the nobility struggled to find partners to marry, the pool of non-related prospective spouses having become substantially smaller. They had to either defy the church's position or look elsewhere for eligible marriage candidates. In the Roman Catholic Church, unknowingly marrying a closely consanguineous blood relative was grounds for a declaration of nullity, but during the eleventh and twelfth centuries dispensations were granted with increasing frequency due to the thousands of persons encompassed in the prohibition at seven degrees and the hardships this posed for finding potential spouses.

In 1215, the Fourth Lateran Council made what they believed was a necessary change to canon law reducing the number of prohibited degrees of consanguinity from seven back to four, but retaining the later method of calculating degrees. After 1215, the general rule was that fourth cousins could marry without dispensation, greatly reducing the need for dispensations. In fourteenth century England, for example, papal dispensations for annulments due to consanguinity (and affinity) were relatively few.

The ban on marriage to minor degrees of relationship imposed by the Roman Catholic Church was met with heavy criticism in the Croatian society in the 11th century, which led to a schism in the Croatian church.

Among the Christian Habesha highlanders of Ethiopia and Eritrea (the predominantly orthodox Christian Amhara and Tigray-Tigrinya), it is a tradition to be able to recount one's paternal ancestors at least seven generations away starting from early childhood, because "those with a common patrilineal ancestor less than seven generations away are considered 'brother and sister' and may not marry." The rule is less strict on the mother's side, where the limit is about four generations back, but still determined patrilinearly. This rule does not apply to Muslims or other ethnic groups.

==== Islam ====
The Quran at 4:22–24 states. "Forbidden to you in marriage are: your mothers, your daughters, your sisters, your father's sisters, your mother's sisters, your brother's daughters, your sister's daughters." Therefore, the list of forbidden marriage partners, as read in the Qur'an, Surah 4:23, does not include first cousins. Muhammad himself married his first cousin Zaynab bint Jahsh.

Financial incentives to discourage consanguineous marriages exist in some countries: mandatory premarital screening for inherited blood disorders has existed in the UAE since 2004 and in Qatar since 2009, whereby couples with positive results will not receive their marriage grant.

== Genetic definitions ==
Average DNA shared between relatives
Relationship	Average DNA shared %
self	100%
parent / child	50%
sibling	50%
half-sibling	25%
grandparent / grandchild	25%
aunt / uncle / niece / nephew	25%
half-aunt / half-uncle / half-niece / half-nephew	12.5%
first cousin	12.5%
half-first cousin	6.25%
double-first cousin	25%
great-grandparent / great-grandchild	12.5%
grandaunt / granduncle / grandniece / grandnephew	12.5%
first cousin once removed	6.25%
second cousin	3.125%

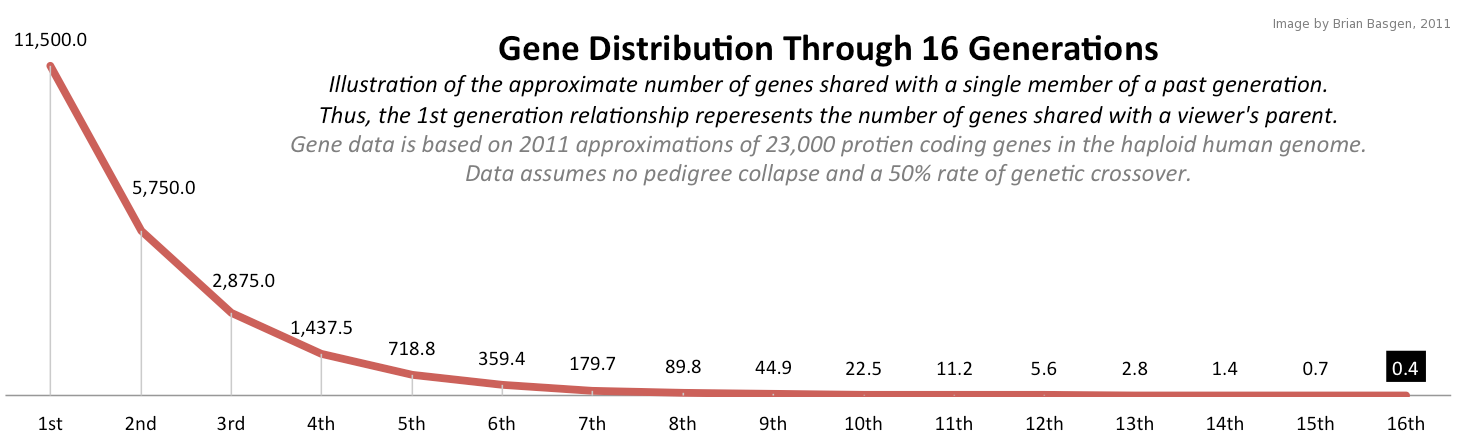
A simplistic depiction of genetic relatedness after n generations as a 2^{−n} progression

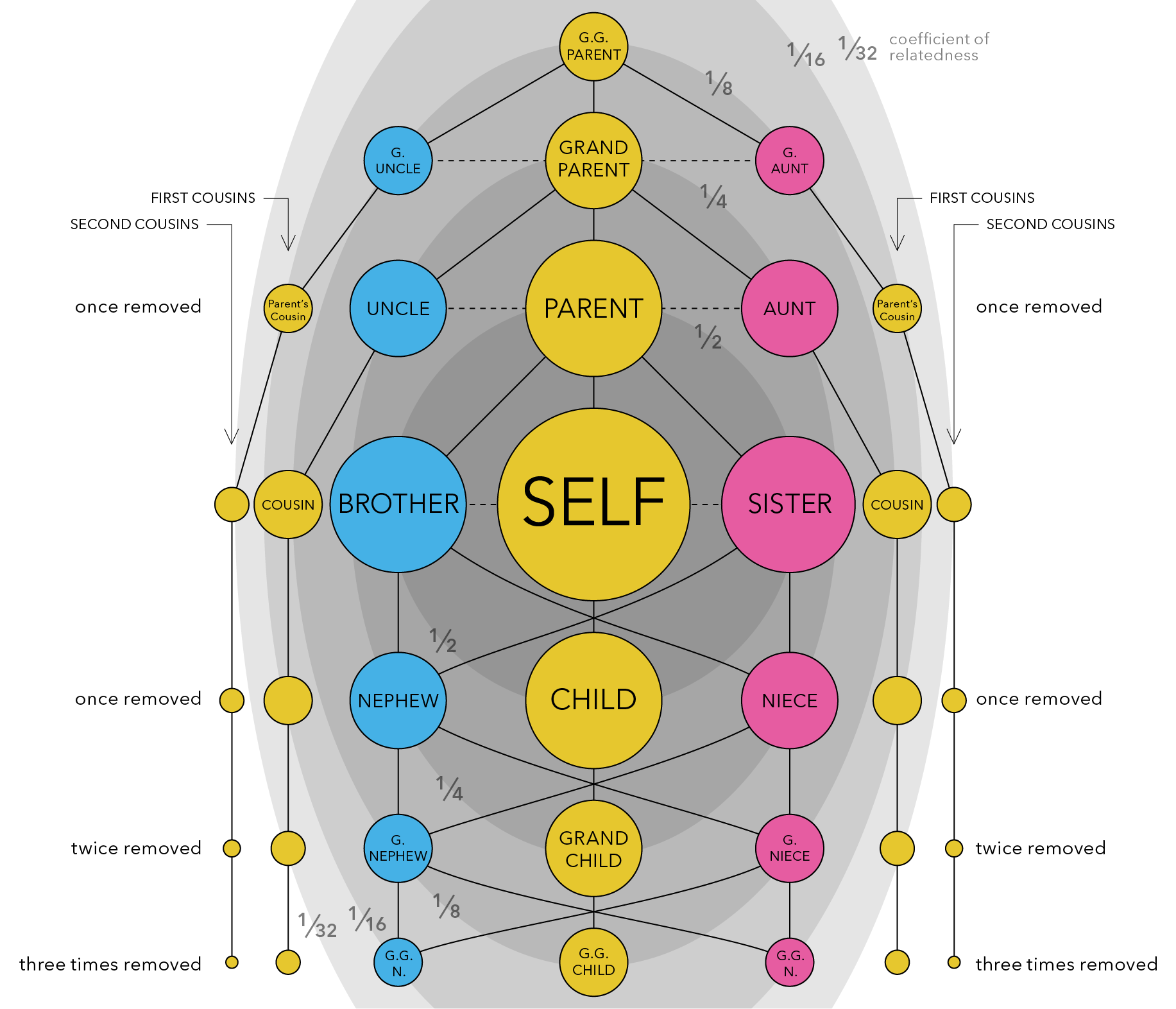
Diagram of common family relationships, where the area of each colored circle is scaled according to the coefficient of relatedness. All relatives of the same relatedness are included together in one of the gray ellipses. Legal degrees of relationship can be found by counting the number of solid-line connections between the self and a relative.

Genetically, consanguinity derives from the reduction in variation due to meiosis that occurs because of the smaller number of near ancestors. Because all humans share between 99.6% and 99.9% of their genome, consanguinity only affects a very small part of the sequence. If two siblings have a child, the child has only two rather than four grandparents. In these circumstances, the probability is increased that the child will inherit two copies of a harmful recessive gene (allele) (rather than only one, which is less likely to have harmful effects).

Genetic consanguinity is expressed as defined in 1922 by Wright with the coefficient of relationship r, where r is defined as the fraction of homozygous due to the consanguinity under discussion. Thus, a parent and child pair has a value of r=0.5 (sharing 50% of DNA), siblings have a value of r=0.5, a parent's sibling has r=0.25 (25% of DNA), and first cousins have r=0.125 (12.5% of DNA). These are often expressed in terms of a percentage of shared DNA but can be also popularly referred to as % of genes although that terminology is technically incorrect.

As a working definition, unions contracted between persons biologically related as second cousins or closer (r ≥ 0.03125) are categorized as consanguineous. This arbitrary limit has been chosen because the genetic influence in marriages between couples related to a lesser degree would usually be expected to differ only slightly from that observed in the general population. Globally it is estimated that at least 8.5% of children have consanguineous parents.

In clinical genetics, consanguinity is defined as a union between two individuals who are related as second cousins or closer, with the inbreeding coefficient (F) equal or higher than 0.0156, where (F) represents the proportion of genetic loci at which the child of a consanguineous couple might inherit identical gene copies from both parents.

== Epidemiology, rates of occurrence ==
=== Cultural factors in favor ===
Reasons favoring consanguinous marriage have been listed as higher compatibility between husband and wife sharing same social relationships, couples stability, enforcing family solidarity, easier financial negotiations and others. Consanguinity is a deeply rooted phenomenon in 20% of the world population, mostly in the Middle East, West Asia and North Africa. Globally, the most common form of consanguineous union is between first cousins, in which the spouses share 1/8 of their genes inherited from a common ancestor, and so their progeny are homozygous (or more correctly autozygous) at 1/16 of all loci (r = 0.0625). Due to variation in geographical and ethnic background and the loci chosen to genotype there is some 2.4% variation expected.

=== Europe ===
Historically, some European nobles cited a close degree of consanguinity when they required convenient grounds for divorce, especially in contexts where religious doctrine forbade the voluntary dissolution of a merely unhappy or childless marriage.

=== Muslim countries ===
In the Arab world, the practice of marrying relatives is common. According to the Centre for Arabic Genomic Research, between 40% and 54% of UAE nationals' marriages are between family members, up from 39% in the previous generation. Between 21% and 28% of marriages of UAE nationals were between first cousins. Consanguineous marriage is much less prevalent in Christian Arabs as they do not practice arranged marriages. Additionally, an indult dispensation is required to marriages contracted between first cousins or closer in Arab Christian denominations in communion with the Roman Catholic Church, and the Greek Orthodox Church; there are no similar regulations that apply to first-cousin marriages in the Coptic Orthodox Church.

In Egypt, around 40% of the population marry a cousin. A 1992 survey in Jordan found that 32% were married to a first cousin; a further 17.3% were married to more distant relatives. 67% of marriages in Saudi Arabia are between close relatives as are 54% of all marriages in Kuwait, whereas 18% of all Lebanese were between blood relatives. The incidence of consanguinity was 54.3% among Kuwaiti natives and higher among Bedouins.

It has been estimated that 55% of marriages between Pakistani Muslim immigrants in the United Kingdom are between first cousins, where preferential patrilateral parallel cousin marriage, i.e. a man marrying the daughter of his father's brother, is favored.

Double first cousins are descended from two pairs of siblings, and have the same genetic similarity as half-siblings. In unions between double first cousins, the highest inbreeding coefficients are reached, with an (F) of 0.125, for example among Arabs and uncle-niece marriages in South India.

=== Quebec ===
The early days of colonization, particularly from 1660 to 1680, gave French Canadians genetic traits that are still present today, owing to the isolation and low population of the early colony. This has led to the province having a higher rate of hypercholesterolemia, tyrosinemia, spastic ataxia, intestinal atresia, myotonic dystrophy, etc., in the population than anywhere else in the world.

== Genetic disorders ==
The phenomenon of inbreeding increases the level of homozygotes for autosomal genetic disorders and generally leads to a decreased biological fitness of a population known as inbreeding depression, a major objective in clinical studies. While the risks of inbreeding are well-known, informing minority group families with a tradition of endogamy and changing their behavior is a challenging task for genetic counseling in the health care system. The offspring of consanguineous relationships are at greater risk of certain genetic disorders. Autosomal recessive disorders occur in individuals who are homozygous for a particular recessive gene mutation. This means that they carry two copies (alleles) of the same gene. Except in certain rare circumstances (new mutations or uniparental disomy) both parents of an individual with such a disorder will be carriers of the gene. Such carriers are not affected and will not display any signs that they are carriers, and so may be unaware that they carry the mutated gene. As relatives share a proportion of their genes, it is much more likely that related parents will be carriers of an autosomal recessive gene, and therefore their children are at a higher risk of an autosomal recessive disorder. The extent to which the risk increases depends on the degree of genetic relationship between the parents; so the risk is greater in mating relationships where the parents are close relatives, but for relationships between more distant relatives, such as second cousins, the risk is lower (although still greater than the general population).

Consanguinity in a population increases its susceptibility to many infectious pathogens such as tuberculosis and hepatitis, but may decrease its susceptibility to malaria and some other pathogens.

== See also ==
- Affinity (Catholic canon law) – Concept in impediments to marriage
- Coefficient of relationship – Measure of biological relationship between individuals
- Cognatic kinship – Mode of descent
- Cousin marriage in the Middle East – Consanguineous relationships in the Middle East
- Endogamy – Marrying within a specific ethnic group, class, or social group
- Exogamy – Social arrangement which only allows marriage outside a social group
- Genetic distance – Measure of divergence between populations
- Genetic diversity – Total number of genetic characteristics in a species
- Genealogy – Study of family lineage and history
- Inbreeding – Reproduction by closely related organisms
- Inbreeding avoidance – Evolutionary biology concept of prevention of negative inbreeding effects
- Inbreeding depression – Reduced fitness as a result of inbreeding
- Incest – Sexual activity between close relatives
- Incest taboo – Cultural rule that prohibits incest
- Legality of incest – Legality of sexual relationships between family members
- List of coupled cousins – First cousin marriages
- Mahram – Non-marriageable kin in Islamic law
- Mendelian inheritance – Type of biological inheritance
- Milk kinship – Type of fostering allegiance formed during nursing by a non-biological mother
- Prohibited degree of kinship – Blood relatedness that makes certain actions illegal
- Proximity of blood – Way to determine hereditary succession
