= Avunculate marriage =

Union of an uncle/aunt or their nephew/niece

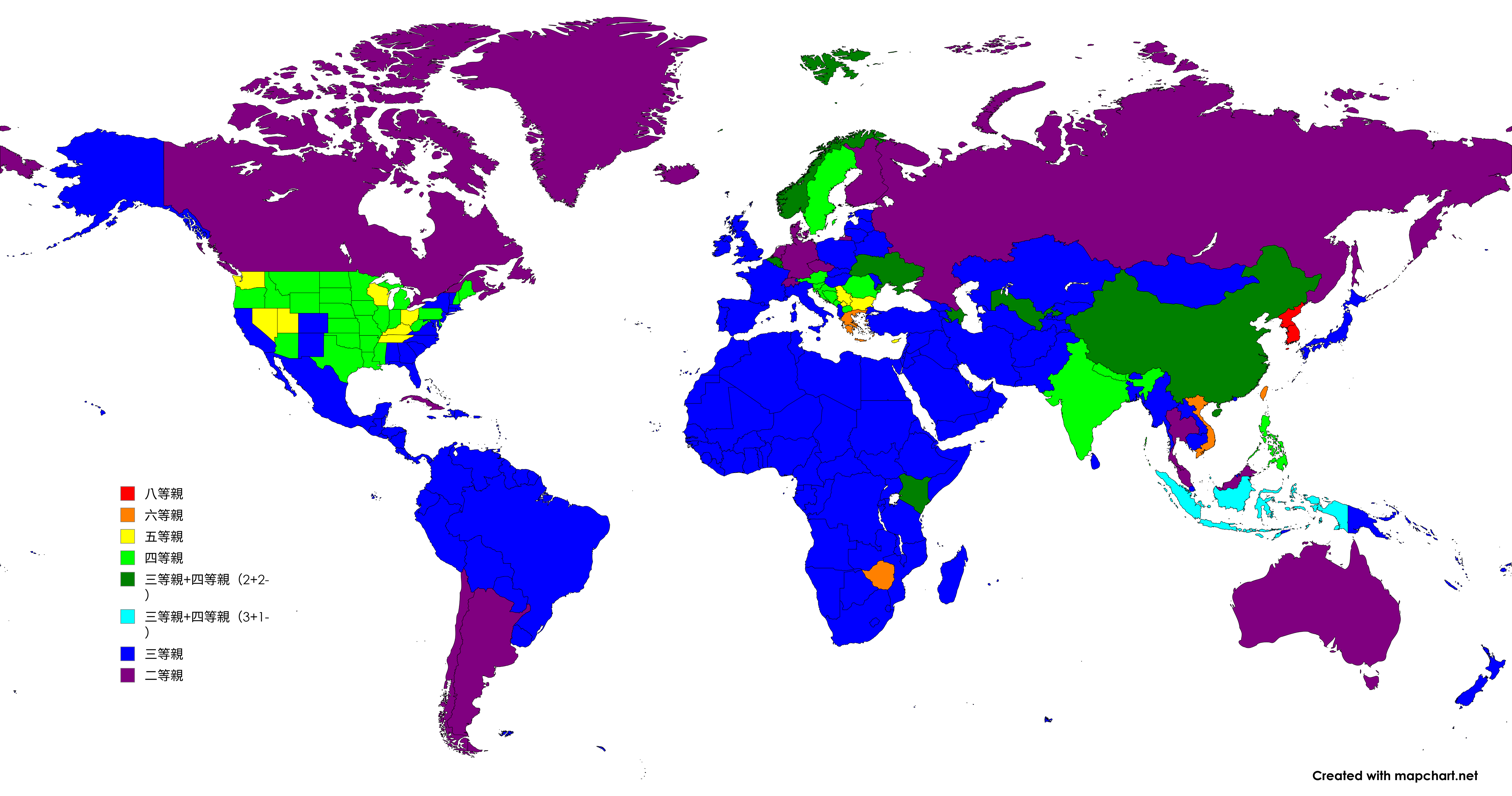
Prohibited degree of kinship of marriage (Roman law) (not under permission, not adopted, full-blood (not half-blood), opposite sex, both are under the age of 50, none is infertile, with no proof of genetic counseling from a genetic counselor): Within degree 8 (third cousin) Within degree 6 (second cousin) Within degree 5 (first cousin once removed) Within degree 4 (first cousin/granduncle-grandniece) Within degree 3 (uncle-niece), and for degree 4, first cousin is prohibited but granduncle-grandniece is not prohibited Within degree 3 (uncle-niece), and for degree 4, granduncle-grandniece is prohibited but first cousin is not prohibited Within degree 3 (uncle-niece), i.e. allow first cousin marriage and granduncle-grandniece marriage Within degree 2 (sibling), i.e. allow avunculate marriage (uncle-niece marriage)

An avunculate marriage (or uncle/aunt-niece/nephew marriage) is a marriage with a parent's sibling or with one's sibling's child—i.e., an uncle or aunt marrying their niece or nephew. Such a marriage may occur between biological (consanguine) relatives or between persons related by marriage (affinity). In some countries, avunculate marriages are prohibited by law, while in others marriages between such biological relatives are both legal and common, though now far less common.

If the partners in an avunculate marriage are biologically related, they normally have the same genetic relationship as half-siblings, or a grandparent and grandchild—that is they share approximately 25% of their genetic material. (They are therefore more closely related than partners in a marriage between first cousins or between granduncle/grandaunt and grandniece/grandnephew, in which on average the members share 12.5% of inherited genetic material, but less than that of a marriage between, for instance, three-quarter siblings, in which the partners share 37.5% of their inherited genetic material.)

Avunculate marriage is permitted in Denmark, Germany, Switzerland, Czech Republic, Chile, Argentina, Australia, Canada, Finland, Macau, Thailand, Malaysia, The Netherlands, Cuba and Russia. In the United States it is permitted in some circumstances in two states. In New York a marriage between a woman and her mother's half-brother was upheld by the New York Court of Appeals. In Rhode Island there is an exception to the general prohibition against "kindred marriages" for Jewish marriages allowed by that religion. It is not permitted in New Zealand, Brazil, Ireland, Spain, Portugal, Italy, Hungary, Peru, Mexico, Japan, Hong Kong, Singapore, or the United Kingdom (first cousin marriage and granduncle/grandaunt-grandniece/grandnephew marriage are permitted in these countries). In France, and Indonesia, avunculate marriage is under permission only.

== List of historical avunculate marriages ==
- Ankhesenpepi II and her nephew Merenre Nemtyemsaf
- Perictione and her uncle, Pyrilampes
- Nahor, son of Terah and his niece, Milcah
- Jochebed and her nephew, Amram
- Ahmose I and his half-niece, Ahmose-Sitkamose
- Thutmose I and his half-aunt, Mutnofret
- Smenkhkare and his niece, Meritaten
- Pepi II Neferkare and his aunt, Neith
- Pinedjem I and his half-aunt, Duathathor-Henuttawy
- Menkheperre and his niece, Istemkheb
- Shabaka and his aunt, Qalhata
- Anaxandridas II and an unnamed niece
- Leonidas, King of Sparta and his half-niece, Gorgo
- Arybbas of Epirus and his niece, Troas
- Alexander I of Epirus and his niece Cleopatra of Macedon
- Lucius Tarquinius Superbus and his brother Arruns Tarquinius respectively married sisters Tullia Major and Tullia Minor, who may have been their nieces. Superbus and Tullia Minor later disposed of their original spouses and married each other.
- Cyrus the Great and his aunt Amytis of Media
- Herod the Great married an unnamed niece.
- Salome I and her uncle Joseph
- Antipater II and his half-niece, Mariamne III, who was possibly later married to another half-uncle Herod Archelaus.
- Herod Antipas, Tetrarch of Galilee and Perea and his half-niece Herodias. Herodias was previously married to her other half-uncle Herod II.
- Salome, the daughter of Herod II and Herodias, married Philip the Tetrarch, who was both her half-uncle and half-granduncle.
- Herod of Chalcis and his niece, Berenice
- Philip III of Macedon and his half-niece, Eurydice II of Macedon
- Mithridates III of Pontus and his grand-niece, Laodice
- Seleucus II Callinicus and his aunt Laodice II
- Antigonus II Gonatas and his niece Phila
- Demetrius II Aetolicus and his half-aunt Stratonice of Macedon
- Antiochus X Eusebes and his possible half-aunt Cleopatra Selene of Syria
- Ptolemy VIII Physcon and his niece Cleopatra III of Egypt
- Ptolemy X Alexander I and his niece Berenice III of Egypt
- Ptolemy XII Auletes and his half-niece Cleopatra V
- Emperor Hui of Han and his niece Empress Zhang Yan (192 BC)
- Sun Xiu and his niece Empress Zhu
- Gwangjong of Goryeo and his half-niece Lady Gyeonghwa
- Injong of Goryeo and his aunt, Princess Yeondeok and Princess Bokchang
- Roman Emperor Claudius and his niece Agrippina the Younger (49)
- Tiberius Claudius Atticus Herodes and his niece Vibullia Alcia Agrippina
- Byzantine Emperor Heraclius and his niece Martina (c. 613)
- Liu Ziye and his aunt Yingmei
- Emperor Kōan and his niece Oshihime
- Yamato Takeru and his aunt Futaji Irihime
- Emperor Kinmei and his half-niece, Ishi-Hime
- Emperor Jomei and his niece Empress Kōgyoku, and his aunt Princess Tame
- Emperor Kōtoku and his niece Princess Hashihito
- Emperor Tenji and his niece Yamato Hime no Ōkimi
- Emperor Tenmu and his nieces Empress Jitō, Princess Ōta, Princess Ōe, and Princess Niitabe
- Prince Kusakabe and his aunt Empress Genmei
- Prince Ōtsu and his half-aunt Princess Yamanobe
- Emperor Shōmu and his aunt Empress Kōmyō
- Musa ibn Musa, Wali of Zaragoza and Governor of Upper March and his half-niece Assona Íñiguez
- Emperor Junna and his niece Princess Seishi
- Prince Abo and his half-aunt Princess Ito
- Emperor Montoku and his half-aunt Fujiwara no Furuko
- Emperor Daigo and his aunt Princess Ishi and his half-aunt Minamoto no Washi
- Emperor Suzaku and his niece Princess Hiroko
- Emperor En'yū and his niece Princess Sonshi
- Emperor Sanjō and his half-aunt Fujiwara no Yasuko
- Emperor Go-Ichijō and his aunt Fujiwara no Ishi
- Emperor Go-Suzaku and his aunt Fujiwara no Yoshiko
- Emperor Go-Suzaku and his niece Fujiwara no Genshi
- Emperor Horikawa and his half-aunt Princess Tokushi
- Emperor Nijō and his half-aunt Princess Yoshiko
- Emperor Go-Fukakusa and his aunt Fujiwara no Kimiko
- Emperor Fushimi and his aunt Tōin Sueko
- Emperor Go-Daigo and his half-aunt Princess Kenshi
- Anjong of Goryeo and his half-niece Queen Heonjeong
- Merovech and his aunt Brunhilda of Austrasia
- Ralph I, Count of Vermandois and his half-niece Laurette of Flanders (1152)
- Amaury I, Lord of Craon and his half-grandniece, Jeanne des Roches, Dame of Sablé (1212)
- Alfonso X of Castile had a concubinage with his paternal half-aunt Maria Alfonso de Leon
- Rupert I, Elector Palatine and his great-grandniece Beatrix of Berg (1385)
- John, Constable of Portugal and his half-niece, Isabel of Barcelos (1424)
- Alvaro de Zuñiga, third Duke of Bejar and his niece Leonor Pimentel y Zúñiga,
- Afonso V of Portugal and his niece, Joanna of Castile (1475)
- Jacques of Savoy, Count of Romont and his niece, Marie of Luxembourg, Countess of Vendôme (1484)
- Joanna of Naples and her half-nephew, King Ferdinand II of Naples (1496)
- Ferdinand II of Aragon and his half-grandniece, Germaine of Foix (1505)
- Philip II of Spain and his niece, Anna of Austria (1570)
- Charles II, Archduke of Austria and his niece, Maria Anna of Bavaria (1571)
- Ferdinand II, Archduke of Austria, and his niece, Anne Juliana Gonzaga (1582)
- Chiefess Kapohauola and her nephew, Chief Kakaʻe
- Fernando de Borja y Aragón and his niece, María Francisca de Borja y Aragón
- John III of Rietberg and his niece, Sabina Catharina of East Frisia (1601)
- Maximilian I, Elector of Bavaria and his niece, Archduchess Maria Anna of Austria (1635)
- Prince Maurice of Savoy and his niece, Princess Luisa Cristina of Savoy (1642)
- Karl Eusebius, Prince of Liechtenstein and his niece, Johanna Beatrix of Dietrichstein (1644)
- Philip IV of Spain and his niece, Mariana of Austria (1649)
- Borso d'Este and his niece, Ippolita d'Este (1647)
- Louis Charles d'Albert, 2nd Duke of Luynes and his aunt Princess Anne de Rohan-Montbazon (1661)
- Leopold I, Holy Roman Emperor and his niece, Margaret Theresa of Austria (1666).
- Adolphus Frederick II, Duke of Mecklenburg-Strelitz and his half-grandniece Princess Johanna of Saxe-Gotha (1702)
- Voltaire (François-Marie Arouet), lived in concubinage with his niece, Marie Louise Mignot Denis.
- Christian, Landgrave of Hesse-Wanfried-Rheinfels and his niece Countess Maria Franziska of Hohenlohe-Bartenstein (1731)
- Ferdinand Bonaventura II von Harrach and his niece Maria Rosa von Harrach-Rohrau (1740)
- Juan López Pacheco, Duke of Escalona and his niece Maria Lopez Pacheco (1748)
- Pedro Téllez-Girón, 8th Duke of Osuna and his niece María Vicenta Pacheco Téllez-Girón (1753)
- Prince Augustus Ferdinand of Prussia and his niece Margravine Elisabeth Louise of Brandenburg-Schwedt (1755)
- Peter III of Portugal and his niece Maria I of Portugal (1760)
- Károly József Batthyány and his niece Countess Maria Antonia Batthyány von Német-Ujvár
- Marianna Valguarnera d’Ucrìa and her uncle Pietro Girolamo Valguarnera
- Frederick Erdmann, Prince of Anhalt-Pless and his niece Countess Louise Ferdinande zu Stolberg-Wernigerode (1766)
- Prince Benedetto, Duke of Chablais and his half-niece Princess Maria Ana of Savoy (1775)
- Infanta Benedita and her nephew, José, Prince of Brazil (1777)
- Prince Eugene of Saxe-Hildburghausen and his niece, Caroline of Saxe-Hildburghausen (1778)
- Harman Blennerhassett and his niece, Margaret Agnew (1794)
- Infante Antonio Pascual of Spain and his niece, Infanta Maria Amalie of Spain (1795)
- King Kamehameha the Great of Hawaiʻi and his half-niece, Queen Keōpūolani (c. 1796)
- Jorge Tadeo Lozano, President of Cundinamarca (Colombia), and his niece María Tadea Lozano e Isasi (m. 1797)
- Sir John Acton, 6th Baronet, Prime Minister of Naples and his niece Marianna Acton (1799)
- Louis Victor Meriadec de Rohan-Guéméné and his niece Bertha de Rohan-Guéméné (1802)
- Francis IV, Duke of Modena, and his niece, Maria Beatrice of Savoy (titular queen of England and Scotland according to the Jacobite succession) (1812)
- Ernest Constantine, Landgrave of Hesse-Philippsthal, and his niece, Caroline of Hesse-Philippsthal (1812).
- Irineu Evangelista de Sousa, Viscount of Mauá, Brazilian entrepreneur, industrialist, banker and politician, and his niece Maria Joaquina "May" de Sousa Machado (1841).
- Leopold, Prince of Salerno and his niece, Archduchess Clementina of Austria (1816).
- Infante Carlos, Count of Molina, and his niece, Infanta Maria Francisca of Portugal (1816), and later his niece, Maria Teresa of Portugal (1838)
- Kamehameha II and his half-niece Kalani Pauahi
- Ferdinand VII of Spain and his niece Maria Isabel of Portugal (1816), and later his niece Maria Christina of the Two Sicilies (1829).
- Gustav, Landgrave of Hesse-Homburg and his niece, Princess Louise of Anhalt-Dessau (1818).
- Leopold, Grand Duke of Baden and his half-grandniece Princess Sophie of Sweden (1819).
- Infante Francisco de Paula of Spain and his niece Princess Luisa Carlotta of the Two Sicilies (1819).
- Ernest I, Duke of Saxe-Coburg and Gotha and his niece Duchess Marie of Württemberg (1832).
- James Mayer de Rothschild, founder of the French branch of the Rothschild banking family, and his niece Betty Salomon von Rothschild (c. 1825).
- Prince Francis, Count of Trapani and his niece Archduchess Maria Isabella of Austria (1850).
- Mongkut and his half-grandniece Somanass Waddhanawathy (1851), and his half-grandniece Debsirindra (1851), and later his half-grandniece Phannarai (1851).
- Svasti Sobhana and his half-niece Abha Barni, and later his half-niece Chavi Vilaya Gagananga.
- Richard von Metternich (son of the famous Austrian Chancellor) and his niece, Pauline von Metternich (1856).
- Ignacy Łukasiewicz and his niece, Honorata Stacherska (1857).
- Porfirio Díaz, 33rd President of Mexico, and his niece, Delfina Ortega Díaz (1867).
- Duke Nicholas of Württemberg and his half-niece Duchess Wilhelmine of Württemberg (1868).
- Prince William of Hesse-Philippsthal-Barchfeld and his half-niece Princess Juliane of Bentheim and Steinfurt (1873), and later his half-niece Princess Adelaide of Bentheim and Steinfurt (1879).
- Amadeo I of Spain and his niece, Maria Letizia Bonaparte (1888).
- Henryk Sienkiewicz, Polish novelist, and his niece, Maria Babska (1904).
- Constantin Carathéodory, Greek mathematician, and his aunt, Euphrosyne Carathéodory (1909).
- Alois Hitler and his niece Klara Hitler, parents of Adolf Hitler (1885). After they were married, Klara still called her husband "uncle". Adolf himself declared that his own half-niece Geli Raubal was the only woman he ever loved.
- Zachariah Fugate and his aunt Mary Smith (1890s).
- Arturo Grullón, Dominican Republic painter and doctor, and his niece Filomena Grullón (1909).
- Anton Mussert and his aunt Maria Witlam (1917).
- Enrique Loynaz, a Cuban patriot, married his niece Carmen Loynaz in his third marriage (1922).
- Prince Vongsanuvatra Dhevakul and his half-niece Princess Kamolpramot Kitiyakara (1930s).
- Norodom Sihanouk and his half-aunt Sisowath Pongsanmoni (1945), and later his half-aunt Sisowath Monikessan.
- Julio César Turbay Ayala, 26th President of Colombia, and his niece, Nydia Quintero Turbay (1948).

== History ==
=== Ancient world ===
Avunculate marriage was a preferred type of union in some pre-modern societies. Marriages between such close relatives were frequent in Ancient Egypt among royalty.

=== Judaism ===
Judaism forbids marriage between an aunt and her nephew but allows marriage between an uncle and his niece. The Talmud and Maimonides encourage marriages between uncles and nieces, though some Jewish religious communities, such as the Sadducees, believed that such unions were prohibited by the Torah.

=== Christianity ===
Among medieval and especially early-modern Christians, a marriage between a woman and the sibling of a parent was not always interpreted as violating Leviticus 18. This was especially so among the royal houses of Europe, and in Catholic countries a papal dispensation could be obtained to allow such a marriage.

=== Islam ===
Marriage between an uncle and his niece, or an aunt and her nephew, are completely forbidden in Islam if they are blood relatives.

=== Early Modern European royals ===
Avunculate marriages were prominent in the House of Habsburg. For example, Charles II of Spain was the son of an uncle and niece, Philip IV and Mariana of Austria; in turn, both of Philip's parents (and therefore both of Mariana's maternal grandparents) were the children of uncle-niece marriages, one of which also produced Mariana's paternal grandfather. As a result, instead of Charles' parents, grandparents, great-grandparents, great-great-grandparents, great-great-great-grandparents, and great-great-great-great-grandparents adding up to 126 different individuals, they numbered only 50.

=== Hindus in South India ===
Avunculate marriage was common among Hindus in South India except Kerala. Currently, it is mostly practiced in rural and small to medium cities. The most common form is where the elder daughter is married away to her youngest maternal uncle. The wedding is usually called Maman Kalyanam (Thai Maman Kalyanam in Tamil Nadu). It was culturally preferred for at least one daughter to be married to an uncle. This is extensively featured as a plot device in many South Indian movies, such as Thai Maaman (1994).

== Genetics ==
In an uncle–niece or a double first cousin marriage, the couple is assumed to have inherited 1/4 of their genes from a common ancestor, whereas in first cousin unions the assumption is that the couple has inherited 1/8 of their genes from a common ancestor, and for a second cousin couple the comparable proportion is 1/32. This means that on average the progeny of an uncle–niece or a double first cousin marriage will be expected to have inherited identical gene copies at 1/8 of all their loci, defined as a coefficient of inbreeding F = 0.125. It follows that for first cousin progeny, F = 0.0625, that is, 1/16 loci predictably are homozygous, whereas for second cousins, F = 0.0156, that is, 1/64 of loci are homozygous.

A 1990 study conducted in South India found that the incidence of malformations was slightly higher in uncle-niece progeny (9.34%) compared to the first cousin progeny (6.18%). Malformations of major systems were significantly more frequent among the consanguineous couples, whereas malformations of the eyes, ears, and skin did not show any significant effect of consanguinity. Stillbirth rates were significantly higher among consanguineous couples irrespective of the mother's socioeconomic status, and were higher in uncle-niece mating's compared to first cousin and beyond first cousin unions in both the poor and middle/upper class. A significant decrease in the mean birth weight and head circumference of babies born to consanguineous parents was noted in both the poor and middle/upper socioeconomic class. The mean length was less in babies born to consanguineous parents belonging to the poor social class only.

== See also ==
- Consanguine marriage
- Consanguinity
- Cousin marriage
- List of coupled cousins
- Sibling marriage
