= 663 =

Calendar year

663 in various calendars
- Gregorian calendar: 663; DCLXIII
- Ab urbe condita: 1416
- Armenian calendar: 112; ԹՎ ՃԺԲ
- Assyrian calendar: 5413
- Balinese saka calendar: 584–585
- Bengali calendar: 69–70
- Berber calendar: 1613
- Buddhist calendar: 1207
- Burmese calendar: 25
- Byzantine calendar: 6171–6172
- Chinese calendar: 壬戌年 (Water Dog); 3360 or 3153 — to — 癸亥年 (Water Pig); 3361 or 3154
- Coptic calendar: 379–380
- Discordian calendar: 1829
- Ethiopian calendar: 655–656
- Hebrew calendar: 4423–4424
- Hindu calendars
- Vikram Samvat: 719–720
- Shaka Samvat: 584–585
- Kali Yuga: 3763–3764
- Holocene calendar: 10663
- Iranian calendar: 41–42
- Islamic calendar: 42–43
- Japanese calendar: Hakuchi 14 (白雉１４年)
- Javanese calendar: 554–555
- Julian calendar: 663; DCLXIII
- Korean calendar: 2996
- Minguo calendar: 1249 before ROC 民前1249年
- Nanakshahi calendar: −805
- Seleucid era: 974/975 AG
- Thai solar calendar: 1205–1206
- Tibetan calendar: ཆུ་ཕོ་ཁྱི་ལོ་ (male Water-Dog); 789 or 408 or −364 — to — ཆུ་མོ་ཕག་ལོ་ (female Water-Boar); 790 or 409 or −363

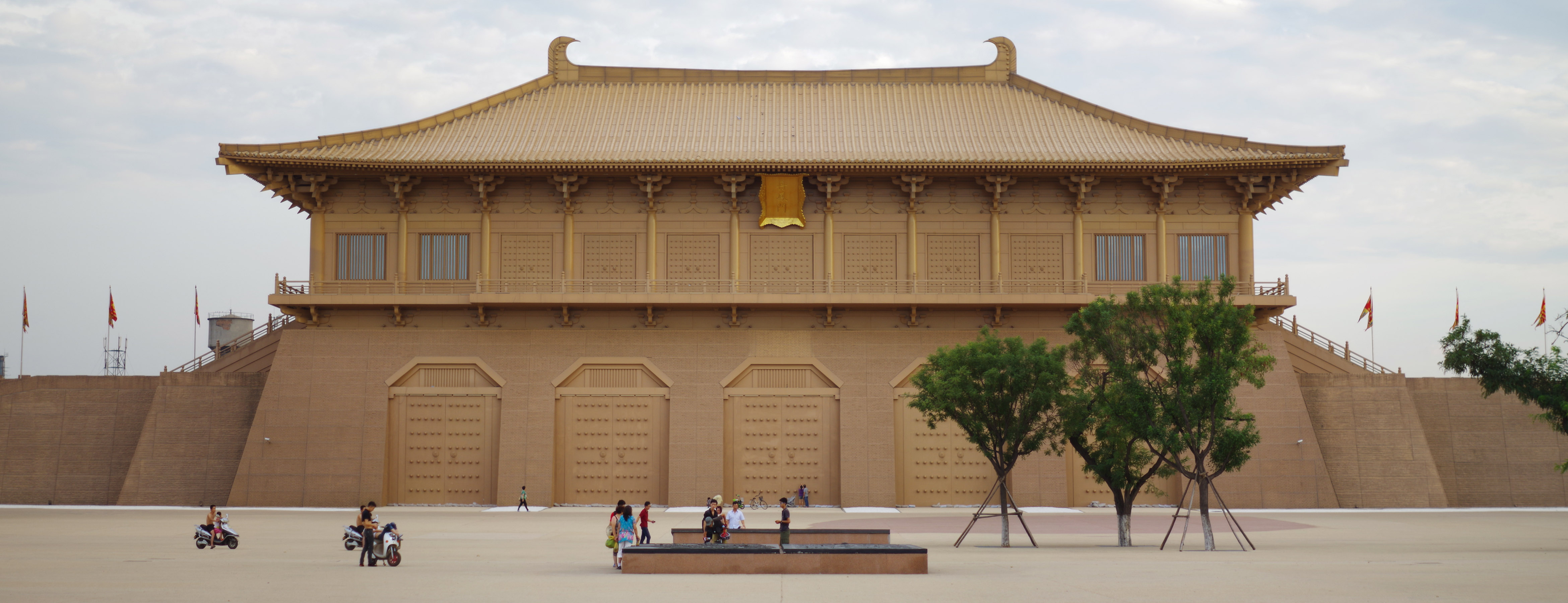
"Danfeng Gate" of the Daming Palace (China)

Year 663 (DCLXIII) was a common year starting on Sunday of the Julian calendar. The denomination 663 for this year has been used since the early medieval period, when the Anno Domini calendar era became the prevalent method in Europe for naming years.

== Events ==
=== By place ===
==== Byzantine Empire ====
- Emperor Constans II launches an assault against the Duchy of Benevento (Southern Italy). Taking advantage of the fact that Lombard king Grimoald I is engaged against Frankish forces from Neustria, Constans disembarks at Taranto, and besieges Lucera and Benevento.
- Constans II visits Rome for 12 days (the only emperor to set foot in Rome for two centuries), and is received with great honor by Pope Vitalian. Constans gives the order to strip buildings, including the Pantheon, of their ornaments, which will be carried back to Constantinople.
- Constans II moves the imperial court from Constantinople to Syracuse. He tries to stop the Arab conquest of Sicily, and restores Rome as seat of the Byzantine Empire. Constans strips sacred altar vessels from churches all over Rome.
- May 8 – Battle of Forino: The Byzantine army, led by Constans II, is defeated by the Lombards under Romuald I. He seizes Taranto and Brindisi, receiving military aid from the Bulgar Alcek horde, who are settled in the area of Ravenna.

==== Britain ====
- King Oswiu of Northumbria invades Pictland (modern Scotland). He establishes overlordship of, at least, the Southern Pictish sub-kingdoms of Fortriu and Fib (and possibly Circinn).
- A brief outbreak of plague hits Britain (approximate date).

==== Asia ====
- June 5 – In China, the Daming Palace becomes the government seat and royal residence of Emperor Gao Zong of the Tang dynasty.
- Battle of Baekgang: Korean Baekje forces and their Japanese allies are defeated in a naval battle, by a joint Silla–Tang coalition.
- Mount Fuji is estimated to have been first climbed by a monk in this year.

=== By topic ===
==== Religion ====
- Wine, bishop of Winchester, moves the episcopal see north again to Dorchester.

== Births ==
- Nasr ibn Sayyar, Arab general (d. 748)
- Ōtsu, Japanese prince and poet (d. 686)
- Song Jing, chancellor of the Tang dynasty (d. 737)
- Yamanobe, Japanese princess (approximate date)
- Zhang Yue, chancellor of the Tang dynasty (d. 730)

== Deaths ==
- Ago, duke of Friuli (approximate date)
- Cunibert, bishop of Cologne (approximate date)
- Gartnait IV, king of the Picts (approximate date)
- Guaire Aidne mac Colmáin, king of Connacht (Ireland)
- Gwisil Boksin, Korean general of Baekje (Korea)
