= Wilhelm Schallmayer =

German physician (1857–1919)

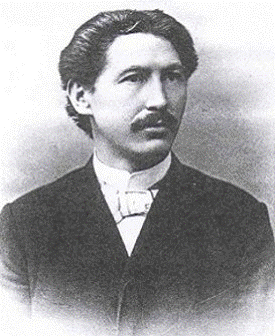
- Born: Friedrich Wilhelm Schallmayer; 10 February 1857; Mindelheim, Kingdom of Bavaria
- Died: 4 October 1919 (aged 62); Krailling, Bavaria, Germany
- Education: Ludwig-Maximilians-Universität München
- Known for: Eugenics

Friedrich Wilhelm Schallmayer (February 10, 1857 – October 4, 1919) was Germany's first advocate of eugenics who, along with Alfred Ploetz, founded the German eugenics movement. Schallmayer made a lasting impact on the eugenics movement.

== Early life and academics ==
After graduation from secondary school in 1876, Schallmayer joined the army as a one-year volunteer. However, due to a "loss of fitness for military duty", caused by overexertion from a military exercise, Schallmayer was discharged from the military, and the potential of a military career ended for him. Sheila Weiss wrote that his brief and unhappy experience in the army likely led to his life-long anti-militarism.

Schallmayer was the firstborn of eleven children and was able to attend the university because his father owned a prosperous carriage and wagon business. Prior to studying medicine, Schallmayer studied philosophy and the social sciences. In 1881, Schallmayer enrolled in the Faculty of Medicine at the Ludwig-Maximilians-Universität München, and in 1883, he passed the state medical examination, becoming a licensed physician. Schallmayer wrote his dissertation while completing his internship at the Ludwig-Maximilians-Universität München's psychiatric clinic. His dissertation outlined the pros and cons of force-feeding psychiatric patients and was titled The Rejection of Food and Other Disorders Regarding Food Intake by the Insane. It concluded that "mental defectives" must be kept alive. Schallmayer further specialized in urology and gynecology.

== Heredity and eugenics ==
In 1891, Schallmayer published his first book, titled Über die drohende körperliche Entartung der Kulturmenschheit und die Verstaatlichung des ärztlichen Standes, translated Concerning the Imminent Physical Degeneration of Civilized Humanity and the Nationalization of the Medical Profession. The book concluded that modern medicine impeded natural selection by aiding the survival and reproduction of those who are "defectively constituted" or "generally weak"; the increase in mental disorders was due to the inability to adapt to the fast-pace of modern industrial civilization; and degeneration has a high economic cost for caring for the insane. Schallmayer also stated that war has a degenerate effect on the population because the fittest go to war and often die while the unfit, who cannot fight, stay at home and procreate. Schallmayer argued that just as society rightfully invest in the education of children, it should also invest in the heredity of future generations.

In 1900, Schallmayer participated in a literary competition and used the theories of August Weismann to support his ideas of human degeneration and to develop a philosophy of "generative ethics" or "subservience of the interest of the individual to that of the species." Schallmayer's treatise also stated that the decline of Ancient Rome and Greece was due to the decline in marriages and raising children; in contrast, China had an old-age civilization based on strong kinship bonds and an aristocracy of talent rather than birth. In 1903, Schallmayer received widespread recognition and review when his treatise, Vererbung und Auslese, won first place in the competition. However, Schallmayer received criticism from social anthropologists because his treatise rejected Aryan race ideologies and the race theories of Arthur de Gobineau. Schallmayer wrote that by Chinese standards, civilization was late to develop in Europe, and even by European standards, it was the Mediterranean civilizations that developed before the German civilizations; Schallmayer went as far to write that: "at the time of Tacitus and Caesar even the Iroquois were more culturally advanced than the Germans." Schallmayer feared that linking eugenics with race theory would discredit and "guide the eugenics movement in a direction that lead nowhere or nowhere good." Sheila Weiss wrote that Schallmayer believed race differences between races were less significant than genetic differences within the same race.

Unlike Alfred Ploetz, Schallmayer did not believe in promoting the Nordic race above others. The early German eugenics movement was ideologically divided along Schallmayer and Ploetz lines, but with the rise of Nazi Germany, Ploetz's views became national policy. In 1939, Leonard Darwin wrote, in the Eugenics Review, that both Schallmayer and Ploetz are the pioneers of German eugenics, but it is up to Germany to decide who had the greater influence in bringing Germany in the right direction.

Diane Paul wrote in the journal of Medical History, that finding out Schallmayer and some other important eugenicists were non-racist is an unexpected and important finding, but more research needs to be done to determine if their views represented Wilhelmine eugenics as a whole. Weiss wrote that the motivation behind Wilhelmine eugenics was to boost national efficiency through the management of the reproductive capacities of the population.

== Political views ==
Schallmayer believed the state had the duty to protect and develop the biological capacity of its people. He praised the Social Democratic Party for their support of science education and collective ownership but criticized the Marxist for their preoccupation and belief in economic equality for all. Schallmayer believed that the political parties were driven by special interest, but eugenics was the philosophy that could unite the parties for a meaningful purpose.

In a discussion with social democrat Oda Olberg, Olberg shared Schallmayer's view that population degeneration was a danger, but she believed that Schallmayer was one-sided and did not focus on the economic causes of degeneration.
