= Barry Mehler =

American scholar activist

Barry Alan Mehler is an American social researcher. He was a professor of humanities at Ferris State University, who founded the Institute for the Study of Academic Racism (ISAR). He earned his B.A. from Yeshiva University in 1970, his M.A. from City College of New York in 1972, and his Ph.D. from University of Illinois at Urbana-Champaign in 1988. His dissertation was entitled, "A history of the American Eugenics Society, 1921-1940."

== Committee to Free Russell Smith ==
In 1977, Mehler was the founder of the Committee to Free Russell Smith, later the International Committee to Free Russell Smith (ICFRS). The committee provided support for and advocated for the release of Russell Dan Smith, an anti-prison rape advocate (founder of POSRIP, which became Just Detention International) who was imprisoned at United States Penitentiary, Marion at the time.

== Cattell controversy ==
In 1997, Mehler was a driving force behind a successful campaign to have an American Psychological Association lifetime achievement award for Raymond B. Cattell postponed because of his "lifetime commitment to fascist and eugenics causes". Mehler's most cited article was written that year and examined Cattell's "Beyondism", in which Cattell thanked several high-profile supporters of scientific racism, including Roger Pearson and Revilo P. Oliver.

== COVID-19 "Welcome Video" Controversy ==
In January 2022, Mehler posted an expletive-laden video to his YouTube channel to welcome students to his class. He discouraged students from attending class in-person due to the risk of transmitting COVID. In the video, Mehler referred to his students as "vectors of disease" and claimed he had given each one of them a grade before the class had even started. He further berated college administrators for requiring him to teach face-to-face classes in light of the COVID-19 pandemic.

Mehler was suspended while Ferris State administration investigated the video. In response, Mehler sued the university, seeking to be reinstated. After a federal judge declined to reinstate him, Mehler settled with the university out of court and retired.

== Selected bibliography ==
- Mehler, Barry A. (1988). A History of the American Eugenics Society, 1921-1940. OCLC 318080890.
- Mehler, Barry. "Controlling Human Heredity: 1865 to the Present by Diane B. Paul" (book review). Isis, Vol. 88, No. 2 (Jun 1997), p. 369
- Mehler, Barry. "The Rise of Statistical Thinking, 1820-1900", Journal of Interdisciplinary History, Vol. 19, No. 2 (Autumn 1988), pp. 294–296 JSTOR 204670
