= Institute for the Study of Academic Racism =

The Institute for the Study of Academic Racism (ISAR) is an organization that monitors "changing intellectual trends in academic racism, biological determinism, and eugenics." ISAR states that in this capacity it "acts as a resource service for students, academics, journalists, legislators and civil rights activists." ISAR was founded by Barry Mehler in 1993.
