= Princess Ōku =

- Saiō of Ise Grand Shrine (673–686)

Saiō
- Predecessor: Princess Sukatehime (Note: Princess Ōku was the first Saiō following the establishment of the Saikū. However, there was already a tradition of maidens worshipping at the shrine before Princess Ōku, with the role of Saiō existing before the establishment of the Saikū.)
- Successor: Princess Taki
- Born: February 12, 661; Ōku, Japan
- Died: January 29, 702 (aged 40); Ōku, Japan
- House: Imperial House of Japan
- Father: Emperor Tenmu
- Mother: Princess Ōta

Ōku (Japanese: 大来皇女 or 大伯皇女) (February 12, 661 – January 29, 702) was a Japanese princess during the Asuka period in Japanese history. She was the daughter of Emperor Tenmu and sister of Prince Ōtsu. As a young girl, she witnessed the Jinshin War. According to the Man'yōshū ("The Anthology of Ten Thousand Leaves"), she became the first Saiō to serve at Ise Grand Shrine. After the death of her brother Prince Ōtsu in 686, she returned from Ise to Yamato to enshrine his remains on Mt. Futakami, before a quiet end to her life at age 40.

== Genealogy ==
Oku was born on the 8th Day of the 1st Month of the Saimei's era 7 (661), in the cabin of the Imperial ship which dropped anchor in the sea of Ōku on the Empress Kōgyoku's way to Kyushu. Her name was derived from her birthplace. She had a younger brother named Prince Ōtsu, who was born three years later in Na no Ōtsu of Kyūshū. Her mother, Princess Ōta, died when Princess Ōku was seven years old.

On the 9th Day of the 10th Month of Tenmu's era 3 (674), when she was twelve, she was appointed the Saiō by her father, Emperor Tenmu, and sent to the Saikū near Ise Shrine and spent thirteen years there as the Saiō to serve the Goddess Amaterasu that dwelt in the shrine.

Her brother Ōtsu earned the Emperor's trust and became one of the candidates of succession. In 686, when the Emperor was dying, Ōtsu secretly visited the Saikū to see her, possibly to tell her that he was likely to succeed the throne after the Emperor died. She was very pleased to see him again and celebrated his promotion. However, after the Emperor died, Empress-consort Uno-no-Sarara had so much power that she declared that her son, Prince Kusakabe, should be appointed the next emperor. She declared Ōtsu a menace, and ordered the officers to arrest him. He was captured on the 2nd Day of the 10th Month, and a day later he was sentenced to death by hanging in his house of Osada.

His death shocked Ōku, who was dismissed from the position of the Saio on account of Ōtsu's death. Death was considered impure, therefore no person with a near relative's death could serve a god or goddess. Ōku then returned to the capital from the Saikū. After returning to the capital, she composed three verses of lament for her brother, which are collected in the Man'yōshū.

After that, she neither did what was recorded in the chronicle nor married anybody. Her only known work by her vow was the foundation of a temple of Natsumi at the Nabari district in the province of Iga.

== Man'yōshū poetry ==
A number of poems are credited to Ōku in the Man'yōshū. The following tell the story of the death of her brother, Prince Ōtsu.

Upon the departure of Prince Ōtsu for the capital after his secret visit to the Shrine of Ise

To speed my brother
Parting for Yamato,
In the deep of night I stood
Till wet with the dew of dawn.
The lonely autumn mountains
Are hard to pass over
Even when two go together-
How does my brother cross them all alone!

On her arrival at the capital after the death of Prince Ōtsu
Would that I had stayed
In the land of Ise
Of the Divine Wind.
Why have I come
Now that he is dead!
Now that he is no more --
My dear brother-
Whom I so longed to see,
Why have I come,
Despite the tired horses!

On the removal of Prince Ōtsu's remains to the Futagami mountains
From tomorrow ever
Shall I regard as brother
The twin-peaked mountain of Futagami-
I, daughter of man!
I would break off the branch
Of the flowering staggerbush
Growing on the rocky shore;
But no one says he lives
To whom I would show it!

== See also ==
- Saiō
