= Consanguine marriage =

Marriage between relatives

Consanguine marriage is marriage between individuals who are closely related. Though it may involve incest, it implies more than the sexual nature of incest. In a clinical sense, marriage between two family members who are second cousins or closer qualifies as consanguineous marriage. This is based on the gene copies their offspring may receive. Though these unions are still prevalent in some communities, as seen across the Greater Middle East region, many other populations have seen a great decline in intra-family marriages.

== Prevalence and stigma ==
Global prevalence of consanguine marriage, illustrating a higher prevalence of cousin marriage in the Middle East in 2013

Globally, 8.5% of children have consanguineous parents, and 20% of the human population live in communities practicing endogamy. Theories on the development of consanguineous marriage as a taboo can be supported as being both a social and a biological development.

=== Social factors ===
From a social perspective, the observed inclination to practice consanguinity has been due to advantages to social and financial status. Upholding familial structure and assets, and ease of marital arrangements are valued among consanguineous marriages. Low age and a lack of awareness of the consequences of inbreeding are common in consanguineous marriages.

Consanguineous marriage is present in every religion, and cannot be accredited to any one religious mandate. Consanguinity is practiced regardless of religious influences and is a result of cultural, historical, regional, and socio-economic factors. A greater number of consanguineous marriages are observed in rural areas compared to urban areas within the same region. This is attributed to the tendency of individuals in rural areas to marry at younger ages, have a lower socio-economic status, and lesser education than those who live in urban areas. Parent's grade of job has also been credited as a factor.

In cases of incest involving a child and adult, legislation usually considers it to be a form of child sexual abuse.

== Epidemiological features ==
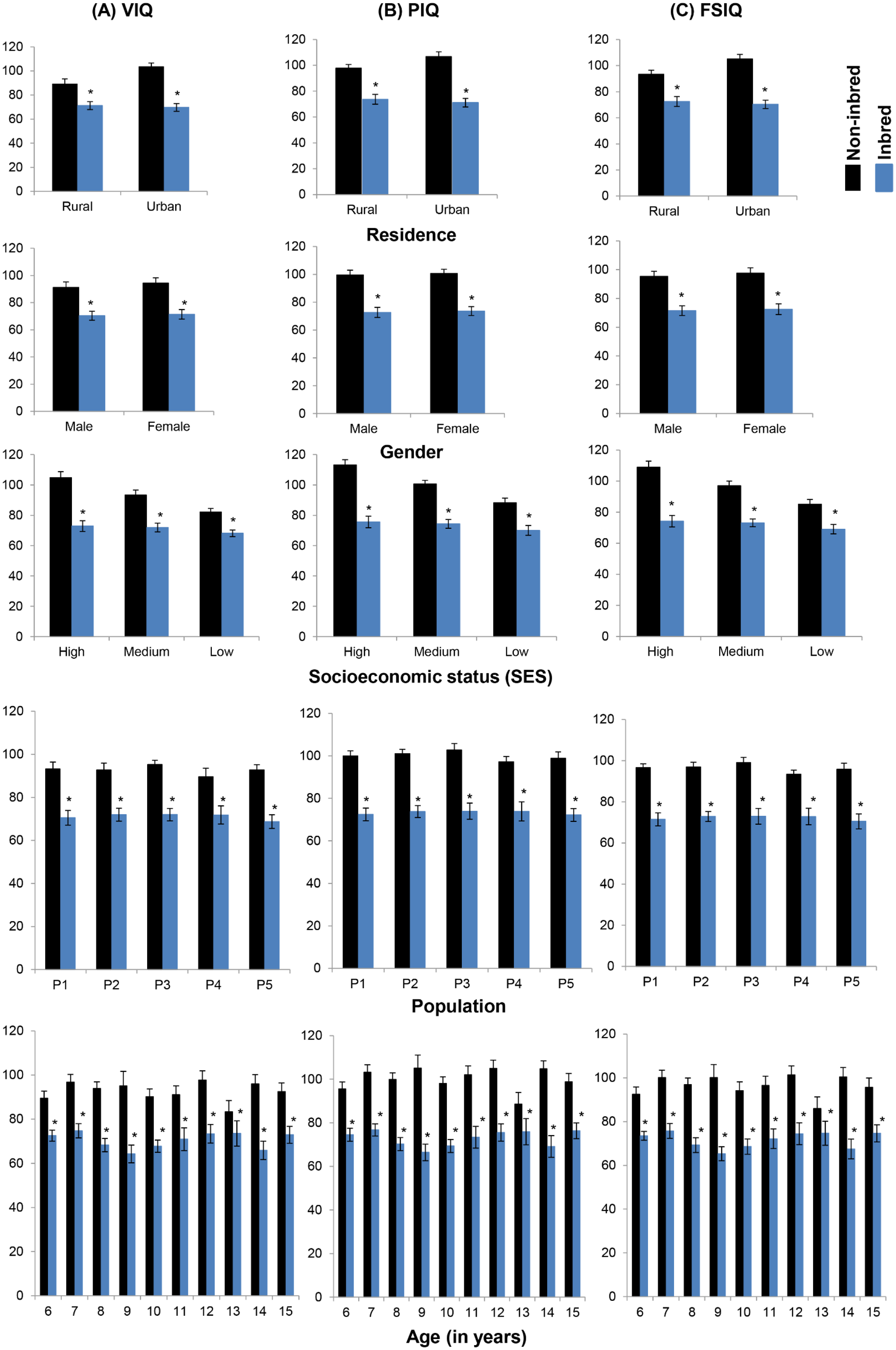
Cognitive abilities among inbred and non-inbred children in "families of five Muslim populations of [the] Jammu region." (Wechsler Intelligence Scales for Children (WISC) was used to measure the verbal IQ (VIQ), performance IQ (PIQ) and full scale IQ (FSIQ)).

Multiple studies have established consanguinity as a high cause for birth defects and abnormalities. A risk of autosomal recessive disorders increases in offspring coming from consanguineous marriages due to the increased likelihood of receiving recessive genes from cognate parents. According to population based case-control studies, a higher risk of stillbirth is associated with consanguineous marriages.

Inbreeding is associated with decreased cognitive abilities in children.

Younger ages of marriage are commonly seen in consanguineous marriages, which may account for the increase in fertility seen in these unions. Chances of postnatal mortality are higher in offspring. The first year holds the highest chance of death due to the risk of autosomal recessive genes. This is also the cause of health complications as children born from consanguinity enter adulthood.

== See also ==
- Avunculate marriage
- Cousin marriage
- Coefficient of relationship
- Laws regarding incest
- Sibling marriage
- Xwedodah
