= Princess Ōta =

- Born: 644?
- Died: 668 (aged 23–24) ?
- Spouse: Emperor Tenmu
- Issue: Princess Ōku; Prince Ōtsu
- Father: Emperor Tenji
- Mother: Soga no Ochi-no-iratsume

Princess Ōta (大田皇女, Ōta no himemiko) (644?–668?) was royalty in Japan during the Asuka Period. She was the eldest daughter of Emperor Tenji. She was the elder sister of Princess Uno-Sarara. She was the mother of Princess Ōku and Prince Ōtsu with Emperor Tenmu. Her mother was Lady Ochi, whose father was Soga no Kurayamada-no-Ishikawamaro.

She was not in good health by nature. She died around 668 when Princess Ōku was seven years old and Prince Ōtsu five. Her body was buried on the 27th day of the second month in that year, together with Empress Saimei and Ōta's aunt, Empress Dowager Hashibito.
