= Prince Ōtsu =

Japanese poet and the son of Emperor Tenmu

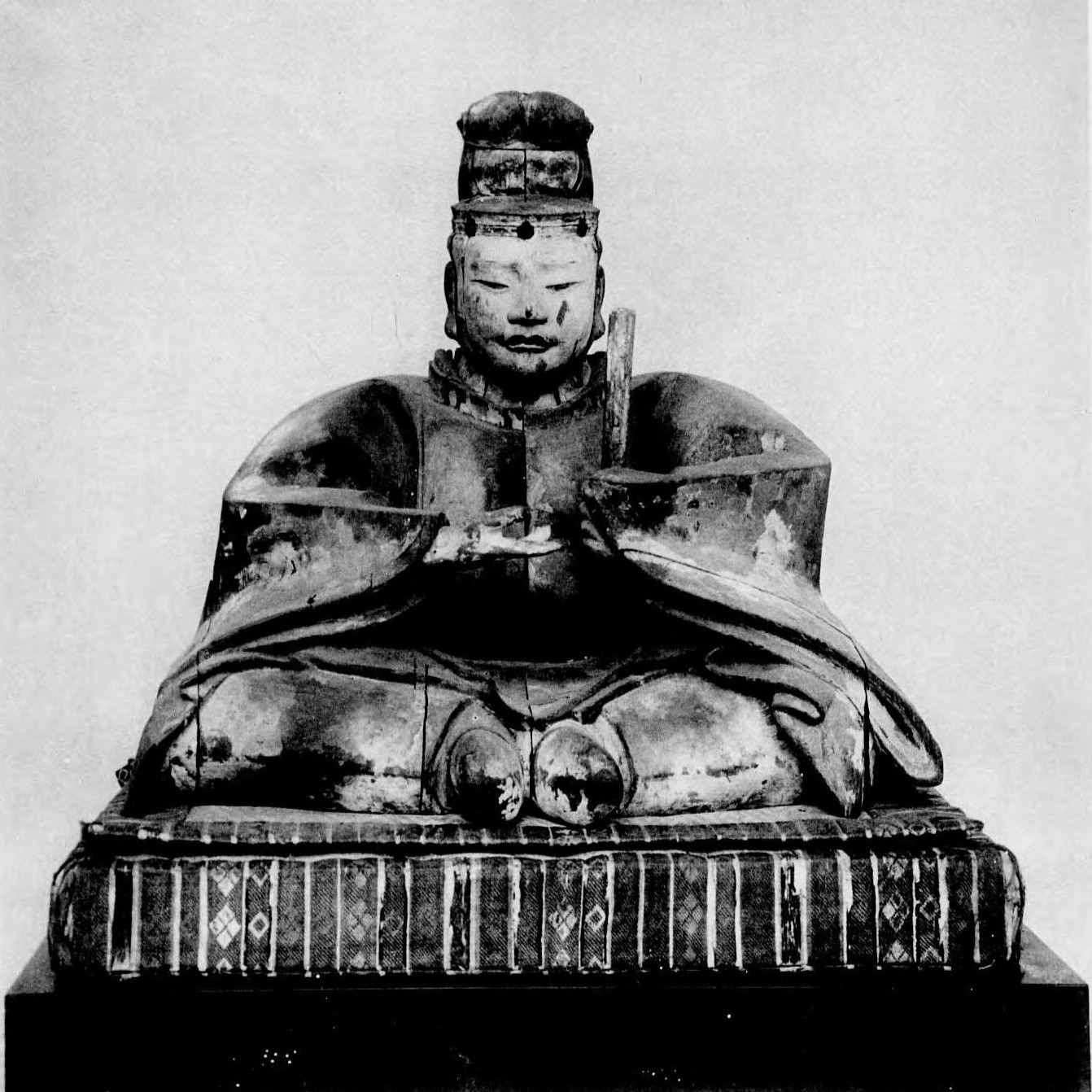
- Muromachi period statue of Prince Ōtsu
- Born: 663; Tsukushi Province, Japan
- Died: October 25, 686 (aged 22–23); Asuka, Japan
- Spouse: Princess Yamanobe
- Issue: Prince Awazuou (粟津王)
- Father: Emperor Tenmu
- Mother: Ōta

Prince Ōtsu (大津皇子, Ōtsu-Ōji; 663–686) was a Japanese poet and the son of Emperor Tenmu.

Viewed as the emperor's likely heir, Imperial Prince Ōtsu began attending to matters of state in 683, but was demoted in 685 when the court rank system was revised. Soon after Emperor Tenmu's death, Ōtsu was accused of conspiracy and was swiftly executed in 686. The last days of his life are described in the Nihon Shoki and Man'yōshū; his personality emerges through poetry anthologies including the Kaifūsō.

== Life ==
His mother was Princess Ōta whose father was Emperor Tenji. He was therefore the younger full-blood brother of Princess Ōku. His consort was Princess Yamanobe, daughter of Emperor Tenji, thus his aunt.

A popular and highly capable figure, Prince Ōtsu was positioned as the likely successor to the imperial throne, but was executed after false charges were laid against him by Empress Jitō in order to promote her own son, Prince Kusakabe, to the position of crown prince. Kusakabe himself died suddenly in 689.

== Poems ==
Two examples of his work are below, including the death poem—

Poem sent by Prince Ōtsu to Lady Ishikawa

Gentle foothills, and
in the dew drops of the mountains
soaked, I waited for you –
grew wet from standing there
in the dew drops of the mountains.

Farewell poem

Momozutau / iware no ike ni / naku kamo wo / kyō nomi mite ya / Kumokakuri nan.

Today, taking my last sight of the mallards
Crying on the pond of Iware,
Must I vanish into the clouds!

== In popular culture ==
Japanese poet and scholar Shinobu Orikuchi featured a fictionalised version of Prince Ōtsu in his novel Sisha no Sho (The Book of the Dead, also made into a film by Kihachirō Kawamoto) as a restless ghost kept on Earth by the memory of a young woman whose gaze he connected with just prior to his death.
