= Princess Yamanobe =

Japanese princess

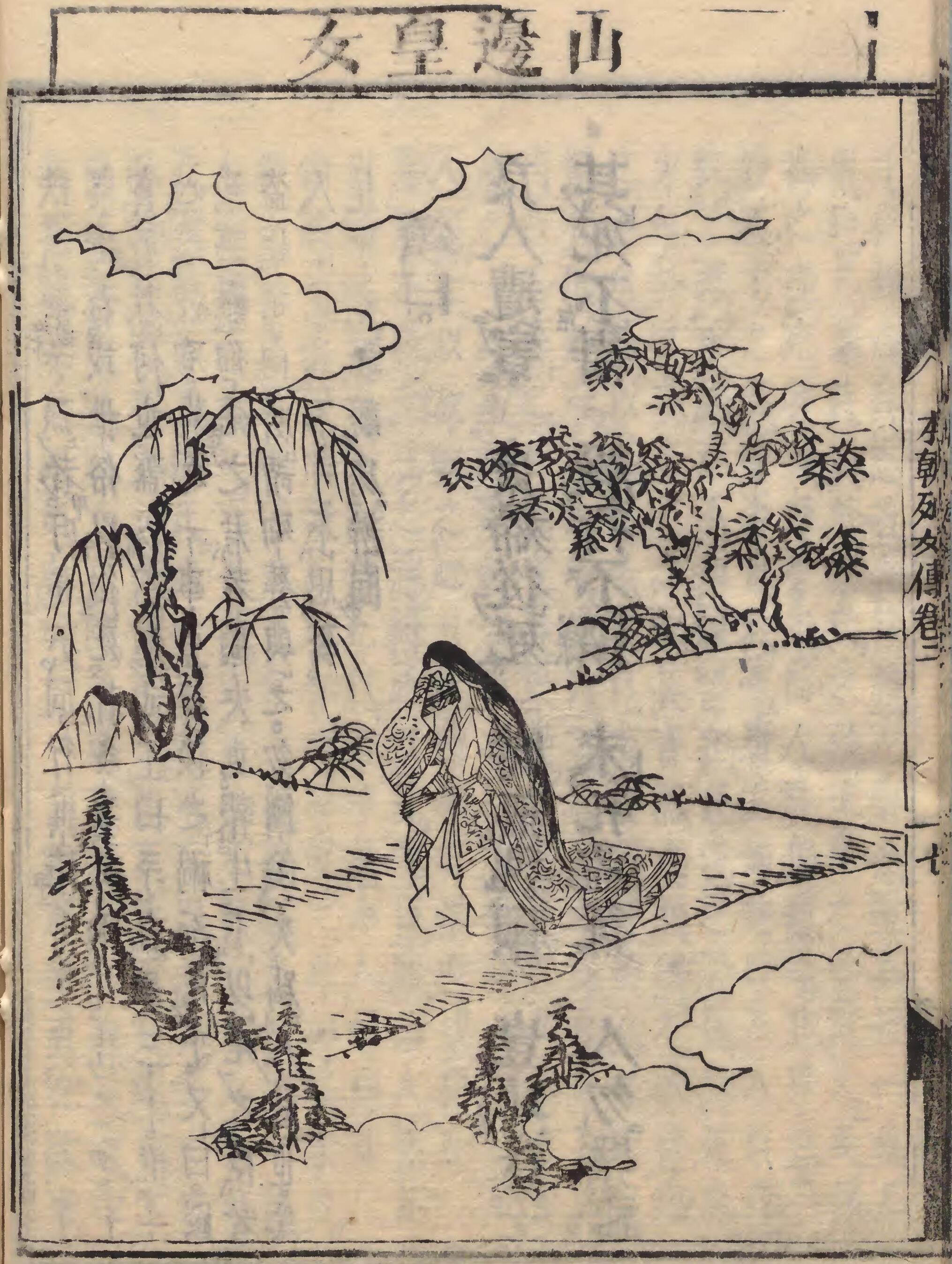
- Died: October 25, 686
- Spouse: Prince Ōtsu
- Children: Prince Awazuou
- Parent(s): Emperor Tenji (father), Lady Hitachi (mother)

Princess Yamanobe (山辺皇女, Yamanobe no himemiko) (? – October 25, 686) lived during the Asuka Period. She was a daughter of Emperor Tenji. Her mother was Lady Hitachi, whose father was Soga no Akae.

She married Prince Ōtsu, and they had one son, Prince Awazuou ((粟津王)). When Prince Ōtsu was executed in 686, she ran out of her house in bare feet with hair disheveled, and killed herself. It is said that people watching her death sobbed with sorrow.
