= Diane Paul =

American historian of science

Diane B. Paul
- Born: February 4, 1946 (age 80)
- Education: Northeastern University; Brandeis University
- Scientific career
- Fields: History of science
- Institutions: University of Massachusetts Boston
- Thesis: The Politics of the Property Tax (1975)

Diane B. Paul (born February 4, 1946) is an American historian of science who is Emeritus Professor of Political Science in the College of Liberal Arts at the University of Massachusetts Boston. She taught in the University of Massachusetts Boston's Department of Political Science for 33 years prior to her retirement in 2003. Among the positions she held at this university was Director of the Program in Science, Technology, and Society. Since then, she has taught at the University of Wisconsin–Madison and the University of California, Los Angeles. She also served as a visiting scholar at the University of Texas Medical Branch's Health Institute for the Medical Humanities from January to March 2018. An expert in the history of evolutionary biology and genetics, she is the former editor of the American Philosophical Society's Mendel Newsletter.
