= Incest =

Sexual activity between close relatives

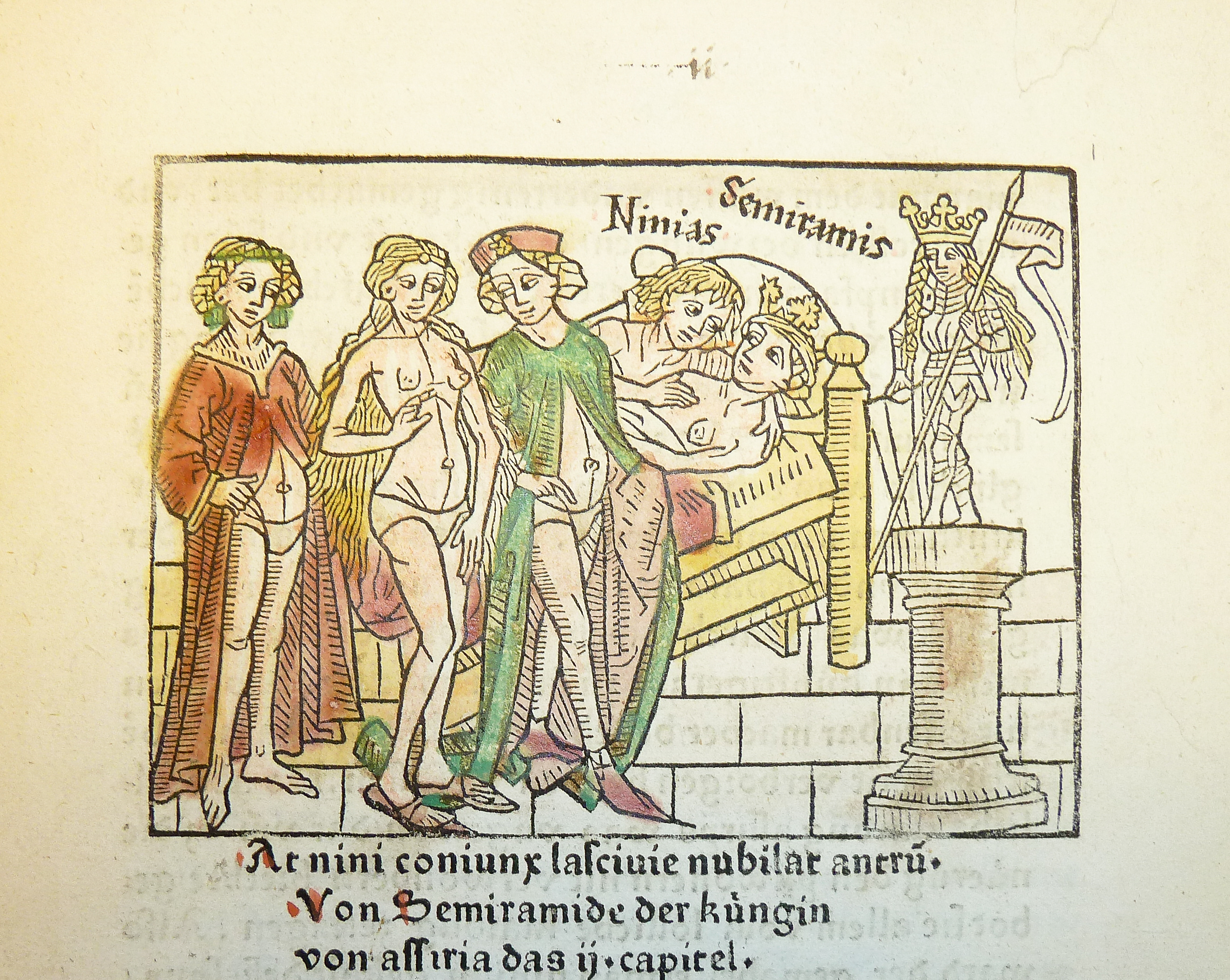
Woodcut illustration depicting incest between Semiramis and her son Ninias

Incest (/ˈɪnsɛst/ IN-sest) is sexual activity between close relatives, such as a sibling or parent. This typically includes any kind of sexual activity between people in consanguinity (blood relations), and sometimes those related by lineage. It is condemned and considered immoral in many societies. It can lead to an increased risk of genetic disorders in children in case of pregnancy from incestuous sex.

The incest taboo is one of the most widespread of all cultural taboos, both in present and in past societies. Most modern societies have laws regarding incest or social restrictions on closely consanguineous marriages. In societies where it is illegal, consensual adult incest is seen by some as a victimless crime. Some cultures extend the incest taboo to relatives with no consanguinity, such as milk-siblings, stepsiblings, and adoptive siblings, albeit sometimes with less intensity. Third-degree relatives (such as half-aunt, half-nephew, first cousin) on average have 12.5% common genetic heritage, and sexual relations between them are viewed differently in various cultures, from being discouraged to being socially acceptable. Children of incestuous relationships have been regarded as illegitimate, and are still so regarded in some societies today. In most cases, the parents did not have the option to marry to remove that status, as incestuous marriages were, and are, normally also prohibited.

A common justification for prohibiting incest is avoiding inbreeding, a collection of genetic disorders suffered by the children of parents with a close genetic relationship. Such children are at greater risk of congenital disorders, developmental and physical disability, and death; that risk is proportional to their parents' coefficient of relationship, a measure of how closely the parents are related genetically. However, cultural anthropologists have noted that inbreeding avoidance cannot form the sole basis for the incest taboo because the boundaries of the incest prohibition vary widely between cultures and not necessarily in ways that maximize the avoidance of inbreeding.

In some societies, such as those of Ancient Egypt, brother-sister, father-daughter, mother-son, cousin-cousin, aunt-nephew, uncle-niece, and other combinations of relations within a royal family were married as a means of perpetuating the royal lineage, or echoing the practices in their creation myths, and were considered normal. Some societies have different views about what constitutes illegal or immoral incest. For example, in Samoa, a man was permitted to marry his older sister, but not his younger sister. However, sexual relations with a first-degree relative (meaning a parent, sibling, or child) were almost universally forbidden in connection with multiple cases of disorders and organ failures.

== Terminology ==
The number next to each box indicates the degree of relationship relative to the given person.

The English word incest is derived from the Latin incestus, which has a general meaning of "impure, unchaste". It was introduced into Middle English, both in the generic Latin sense (preserved throughout the Middle English period) and in the narrow modern sense. The derived adjective incestuous appears in the 16th century. Before the Latin term came in, incest was known in Old English as sib-leger (from sibb 'kinship' + leger 'to lie') or mǣġhǣmed (from mǣġ 'kin, parent' + hǣmed 'sexual intercourse') but in time, both words fell out of use. Terms like incester and incestual have been used to describe those interested or involved in sexual relations with relatives among humans, while inbreeder has been used in relation to similar behavior among non-human organisms.

== History ==
=== Antiquity ===
In ancient China, first cousins with the same surnames (i.e. those born to the father's brothers) were not permitted to marry, while those with different surnames could marry (i.e. maternal cousins and paternal cousins born to the father's sisters).

In Achaemenid Persia, marriages between family members, such as half-siblings, nieces and cousins took place but were not seen as incestuous. However, Greek sources state that brother-sister and father-daughter marriages allegedly took place inside the royal family, yet it remains problematic to determine the reliability of these accounts. According to Herodotus, Shah Cambyses II supposedly married two of his sisters, Atossa and Roxane. This would have been regarded as illegal. However, Herodotus also states that Cambyses married Otanes' daughter Phaidyme, whilst his contemporary Ctesias names Roxane as Cambyses' wife, but she is not referred to as his sister. The accusations against Cambyses of committing incest are mentioned as part of his "blasphemous actions", which were designed to illustrate his "madness and vanity". These reports all derive from the same Egyptian source that was antagonistic towards Cambyses, and some of these allegations of "crimes", such as the killing of the Apis bull, have been confirmed as false, which means that the report of Cambyses' supposed incestuous acts is questionable.

Several of the Egyptian kings married their sisters and had several children with them to continue the royal bloodline. For example, Tutankhamun married his half-sister Ankhesenamun, and was himself the child of an incestuous union between Akhenaten and an unidentified sister-wife. Several scholars, such as Frier et al., state that sibling marriages were widespread among all classes in Egypt during the Graeco-Roman period. Numerous papyri and the Roman census declarations attest to many husbands and wives being brother and sister, of the same father and mother. However, it has also been argued that the available evidence does not support the view that such relations were common.

The most famous of these relationships were in the Ptolemaic royal family; Cleopatra VII was married to two of her younger brothers, Ptolemy XIII and Ptolemy XIV, whilst her mother and father, Cleopatra V and Ptolemy XII, were also brother and sister. Arsinoe II and her younger brother Ptolemy II Philadelphus were the first in the family to participate in a full-sibling marriage, a departure from custom. A union between full siblings was not the norm in Greek and Macedonian tradition, and prohibited by the laws of at least some cities.

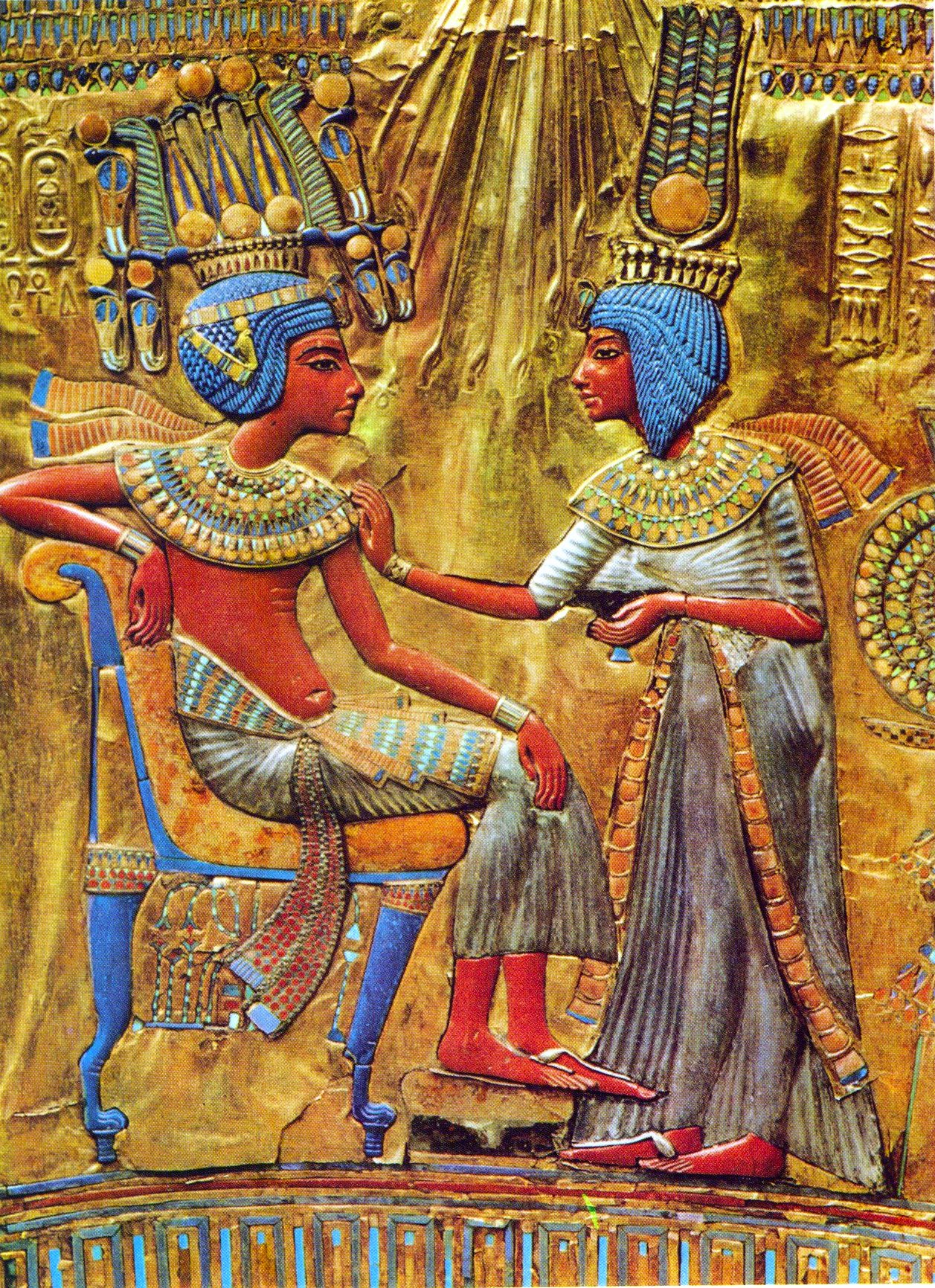
Egyptian king Tutankhamun married his half-sister Ankhesenamun.

The fable of Oedipus, with a theme of inadvertent incest between a mother and son, ends in disaster and shows ancient taboos against incest, since Oedipus blinds himself in disgust and shame after his incestuous actions. In the 'sequel' to Oedipus, Antigone, his four children are also punished for their parents' incestuousness. Incest appears in the commonly accepted version of the birth of Adonis, when his mother, Myrrha, has sex with her father, Cinyras, during a festival, disguised as a prostitute.

In ancient Greece, Spartan King Leonidas I, hero of the legendary Battle of Thermopylae, was married to his niece Gorgo, daughter of his half-brother Cleomenes I. Greek law allowed marriage between a brother and sister if they had different mothers: for example, some accounts say that Elpinice was for a time married to her half-brother Cimon.

Incest is mentioned and condemned in Virgil's Aeneid Book VI: hic thalamum invasit natae vetitosque hymenaeos – "This one invaded a daughter's room and a forbidden sex act".

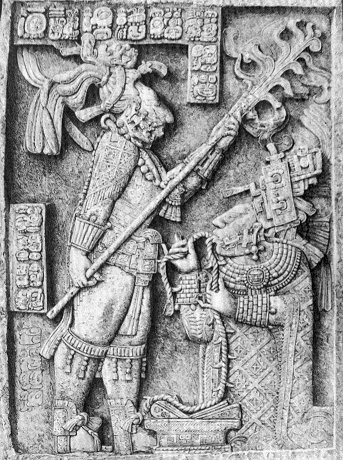
Maya king Shield Jaguar II with his aunt-wife, Lady Xoc AD 709

Roman civil law prohibited marriages within four degrees of consanguinity but had no degrees of affinity with regard to marriage. Roman civil laws prohibited any marriage between parents and children, either in the ascending or descending line ad infinitum. Adoption was considered the same as affinity in that an adoptive father could not marry an unemancipated daughter or granddaughter even if the adoption had been dissolved. Incestuous unions were discouraged and considered nefas (against the laws of gods and man) in ancient Rome. In AD 295, incest was explicitly forbidden by an imperial edict, which divided the concept of incestus into two categories of unequal gravity: the incestus iuris gentium, which was applied to both Romans and non-Romans in the Empire, and the incestus iuris civilis, which concerned only Roman citizens. Therefore, for example, an Egyptian could marry an aunt, but a Roman could not. Despite the act of incest being unacceptable within the Roman Empire, Roman Emperor Caligula is rumored to have had sexual relationships with all three of his sisters (Julia Livilla, Drusilla, and Agrippina the Younger). Emperor Claudius, after executing his previous wife, married his brother's daughter, Agrippina the Younger, and changed the law to allow an otherwise illegal union. The law prohibiting marrying a sister's daughter remained. The taboo against incest in ancient Rome is demonstrated by the fact that politicians would use charges of incest (often false charges) as insults and means of political disenfranchisement.

In Norse mythology, there are themes of brother–sister marriage, a prominent example being between Njörðr and his unnamed sister (perhaps Nerthus), parents of Freyja and Freyr. Loki in turn also accuses Freyja and Freyr of having a sexual relationship.

=== Biblical references ===
The earliest Biblical reference to possible incest involves Cain. It was cited that he knew his wife and she conceived and bore Enoch. A literalist reading of this passage indicates that, during this period, there was no other woman except Eve, or there was an unnamed sister, in which case Cain had an incestuous relationship with his mother or his sister. According to the Book of Jubilees, Cain married his sister Awan. Later, in Genesis 20 of the Hebrew Bible, the Patriarch Abraham married his half-sister Sarah. Other references include the passage in 2 Samuel 13 where Amnon, King David's son, rapes his half-sister Tamar. According to Michael D. Coogan, it would have been perfectly all right for Amnon to have married her, the Bible being inconsistent about prohibiting incest.

In Genesis 19:30–38, while living in an isolated area after the destruction of Sodom and Gomorrah, Lot's two daughters conspire to inebriate and rape their father due to the lack of available partners to continue his line of descent. Because of intoxication, Lot "perceived not" when his firstborn, and the following night, his younger, daughter lay with him.

Moses was also born of an incestuous marriage. Exodus 6 details how his father, Amram, was the nephew of his mother, Jochebed. An account noted that the incestuous relations did not suffer the fate of childlessness, which was the punishment for such couples in Levitical law. It stated, however, that the incest exposed Moses "to the peril of wild beasts, of the weather, of the water, and more."

=== From the Middle Ages onward ===
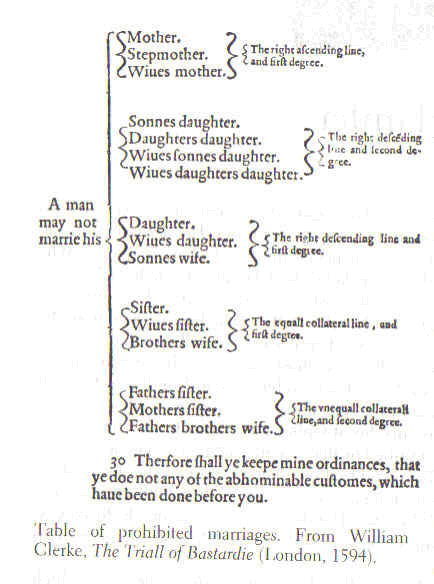
Table of prohibited marriages from The Trial of Bastardie by William Clerke. London, 1594

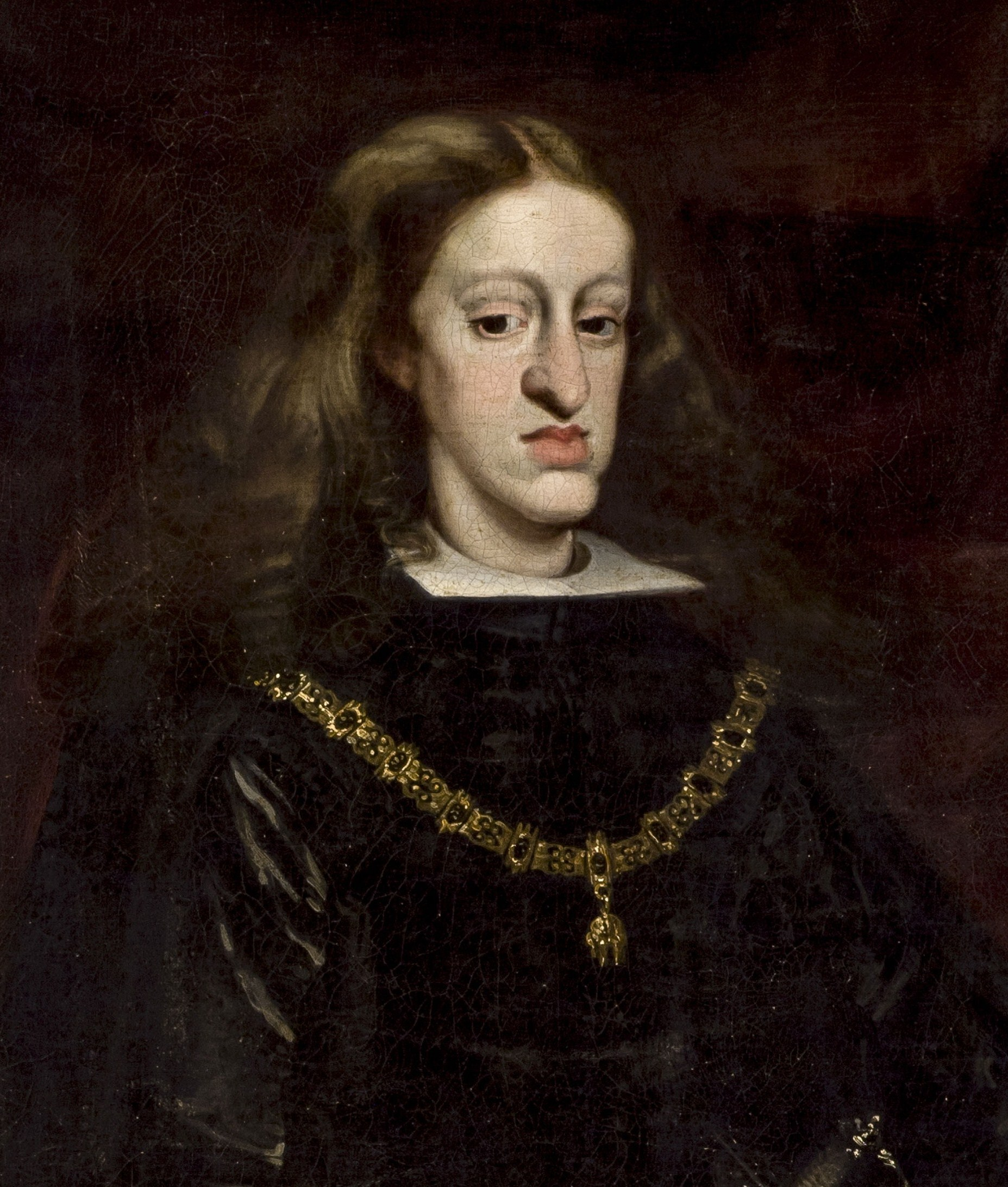
Charles II of Spain was born physically disabled, probably due to centuries of inbreeding in the House of Habsburg, and suffered a particularly pronounced case of Habsburg jaw

According to the records of the Nihon Shoki, during the period from the accession of Emperor Jomei in 629 to that of Emperor Shōmu in 724, seven out of the nine reigning emperors were born of endogamous unions between relatives—including siblings, half-siblings, uncles and nieces, aunts and nephews, and cousins. Many European monarchs were also related due to political marriages, such that many such marriages were between cousins of some degree, uncles and nieces, and so forth, and sometimes first cousins. This was especially true in the Habsburg, Hohenzollern, Savoy, and Bourbon royal houses. However, relations between siblings, which may have been tolerated in other cultures, were considered abhorrent. For example, the false accusation that Anne Boleyn and her brother, George Boleyn, had committed incest was one of the reasons given for both being executed in May 1536. Historians agree that the false accusation against Anne Boleyn and George Boleyn was trumped up in order to ensure the king could go on to marry Jane Seymour. Sects deemed heretical, such as the Waldensians, were accused of incest.

Incestuous marriages were also seen in the royal houses of ancient Japan and Korea, Inca Peru, Ancient Hawaii, and, at times, Central Africa, Mexico, and Thailand. Like the kings of ancient Egypt, the Inca rulers married their sisters. Huayna Capac, for instance, was the son of Topa Inca Yupanqui and the Inca's sister and wife.

Half-sibling marriages were found in ancient Japan, such as the marriage of Emperor Bidatsu and his half-sister Empress Suiko. Japanese Prince Kinashi no Karu had sexual relations with his full sister Princess Karu no Ōiratsume, although the action was regarded as foolish. In order to prevent the influence of the other families, Korean Goryeo dynasty monarch Gwangjong married his half-sister Daemok in the 10th century. Marriage with a family member not related by blood was also regarded as contravening morality and was therefore incest. One example of this is the 14th century Chunghye of Goryeo, who raped one of his deceased father's concubines, who was thus regarded to be his mother.

In a few parts of India, cousin marriage and uncle-niece marriage was common, though it has reduced a lot in the 21st century.

=== Others ===
In some Southeast Asian cultures, stories of incest being common among certain ethnicities are sometimes told as expressions of contempt for those ethnicities.

Marriages between younger brothers and their older sisters were common among the early Udege people.

== Prevalence and statistics ==
Incest between an adult and a person under the age of consent is considered a form of child sexual abuse that has been shown to be one of the most extreme forms of childhood abuse; it often results in serious and long-term psychological trauma, especially in the case of parental incest. Its prevalence is difficult to generalize, but research has estimated 10–15% of the general population as having had at least one such sexual contact, with less than 2% involving intercourse or attempted intercourse. Among women, research has yielded estimates as high as 20%.

Father–daughter incest was for many years the most commonly reported and studied form of incest.

Mother–son incest is rarely reported. According to Catanzarite (1980), between 1965 and 1980 only a handful such cases were documented. Catanzarite attributes this to selection bias and the lack of physical evidence in such cases. According to Etherington (1997), one of the reasons of the under-reporting of such cases is that men often found difficulty in defining their mother's behavior as abuse. In a clinical study by Olson (1990), 30 men had been victims of incest; the mother was a perpetrator in 61.5 % of cases. In a clinical study by Kelly et al. (2002), among the 67 sexually abused men, in 17 cases the perpetrators were their mothers.

More recently, studies have suggested that sibling incest, particularly older brothers having sexual relations with younger siblings, is the most common form of incest, with some studies finding sibling incest occurring more frequently than other forms of incest. Some studies suggest that adolescent perpetrators of sibling abuse choose younger victims, abuse victims over a lengthier period, use violence more frequently and severely than adult perpetrators, and that sibling abuse has a higher rate of penetrative acts than father or stepfather incest, with father and older brother incest resulting in greater reported distress than stepfather incest. South Africa, Saudi Arabia, Sudan, Pakistan, and Nigeria are some of the countries with the most incest through consanguineous marriage.

== Types ==
=== Between adults and children ===
Sex between an adult family member and a child is a form of child sexual abuse, also known as child incestuous abuse, and for many years has been the most reported form of incest. Father–daughter and stepfather–stepdaughter sexual abuse are the most commonly reported forms of adult–child incest, with most of the remaining involving a mother or stepmother. Many studies found that stepfathers tend to be far more likely than biological fathers to engage in this form of incest. One study of adult women in San Francisco estimated that 17% of women were abused by stepfathers and 2% were abused by biological fathers. Father–son incest is reported less often, but it is not known how close the frequency is to heterosexual incest because it is probably more under-reported. The prevalence of incest between parents and their children is difficult to estimate due to the coercive silencing of victims.

In a 1999 news story, the BBC reported: "Close-knit family life in India masks an alarming amount of sexual abuse of children and teenage girls by family members, a new report suggests. Delhi organisation RAHI said 76% of respondents to its survey had been abused when they were children – 40% of those by a family member."

According to the National Center for Victims of Crime a large proportion of rape committed in the United States is perpetrated by a family member:

Research indicates that 46% of children who are raped are victims of family members (Langan and Harlow, 1994). The majority of American rape victims (61%) are raped before the age of 18; furthermore, 29% of all rapes occurred when the victim was less than 11 years old. 11% of rape victims are raped by their fathers or stepfathers, and another 16% are raped by other relatives.

Adults who as children were incestuously victimized by adults often suffer from low self-esteem, difficulties in interpersonal relationships, and sexual dysfunction, and are at an extremely high risk of many mental disorders, including depression, anxiety disorders, phobic avoidance reactions, somatoform disorder, substance abuse, borderline personality disorder, and complex post-traumatic stress disorder.

The Goler clan in Nova Scotia is a specific instance in which child sexual abuse in the form of forced adult–child and sibling–sibling incest took place over at least three generations. A number of Goler children were victims of sexual abuse at the hands of fathers, mothers, uncles, aunts, sisters, brothers, cousins, and each other. During interrogation by police, several of the adults openly admitted to engaging in many forms of sexual activity, up to and including full intercourse, multiple times with the children. Sixteen adults (both men and women) were charged with hundreds of allegations of incest and sexual abuse of children as young as five. In July 2012, twelve children were removed from the 'Colt' family (a pseudonym) in New South Wales, Australia, after the discovery of four generations of incest. Child protection workers and psychologists said interviews with the children indicated "a virtual sexual free-for-all".

While incest between adults and children generally involves the adult as the perpetrator of abuse, there are rare instances of sons sexually assaulting their mothers. These sons are typically mid-adolescent to young adult. Although the mothers may be accused of being seductive with their sons and inviting the sexual contact, this is contrary to evidence. Such accusations can parallel other forms of rape, where, due to victim blaming, a woman is accused of being at fault for the rape. In some cases, mother–son incest is best classified as acquaintance rape of the mother by the adolescent son.

=== Between children ===
Childhood sibling–sibling incest is considered to be widespread but rarely reported. Sibling–sibling incest becomes child-on-child sexual abuse when it occurs without consent, without equality, or as a result of coercion. In this form, it is believed to be the most common form of intrafamilial abuse. The most commonly reported form of abusive sibling incest is abuse of a younger sibling by an older sibling.

Sibling abusive incest is most prevalent in families where one or both parents are often absent or emotionally unavailable, with the abusive siblings using incest as a way to assert their power over a weaker sibling. Absence of the father in particular has been found to be a significant element of most cases of sexual abuse of female children by a brother.

=== Between adults ===
Proponents of incest between consenting adults draw clear boundaries between the behavior of consenting adults on one hand and rape, child molestation, and abusive incest on the other. However, even consensual relationships such as these are still legally classified as incest and criminalized in many jurisdictions (although there are certain exceptions). James Roffee, a senior lecturer in criminology at Monash University and former worker on legal responses to familial sexual activity in England and Wales, and Scotland discussed how the European Convention on Human Rights deems all familial sexual acts to be criminal, even if all parties give their full consent and are knowledgeable to all possible consequences. He also argues that the use of particular language tools in the legislation manipulates the reader to deem all familial sexual activities as immoral and criminal, even if all parties are consenting adults.

==== Aunts, uncles, mothers, fathers, nieces, or nephews ====
Consensual sex between individuals aged 18 and older is always lawful in the Netherlands and Belgium, even among closely related family members. Sexual acts between an adult family member and a minor are illegal, though they are classified not as incest but as abuse of the authority such an adult has over a minor, comparable to that of a teacher, coach, or priest. In Florida, consensual adult sexual intercourse with someone known to be one's aunt, uncle, niece, or nephew constitutes a felony of the third degree. Other states also commonly prohibit marriages between such kin. The legality of sex with a half-aunt or half-uncle varies state by state. In the United Kingdom, incest includes only sexual intercourse with a parent, grandparent, child, or sibling, but the more recently introduced offense of "sex with an adult relative" extends as far as half-siblings, uncles, aunts, nephews, and nieces. However, the term 'incest' remains widely used in popular culture to describe any form of sexual activity with a relative. In Canada, marriage between uncles and nieces and between aunts and nephews is illegal.

==== Between adult siblings ====
One of the most public cases of adult sibling incest in the 2000s is the case of Patrick Stübing and Susan Karolewski, a brother–sister couple from Germany. Because of violent behavior on the part of his father, Patrick was taken in at the age of 3 by foster parents, who adopted him later. At the age of 23 he learned about his biological parents, contacted his mother, and met her and his then 16-year-old sister Susan for the first time. The now-adult Patrick moved in with his birth family shortly thereafter. After their mother died suddenly six months later, the siblings became intimately close, and had their first child together in 2001. By 2004, they had had four children together: Eric, Sarah, Nancy, and Sofia. The public nature of their relationship, and the repeated prosecutions and jail time they have served as a result, have caused some in Germany to question whether incest between consenting adults should be punished at all. An article about them in Der Spiegel states that the couple are happy together. According to court records, the first three children have mental and physical disabilities, and have been placed in foster care. In April 2012, at the European Court of Human Rights, Patrick Stübing lost his case that the conviction violated his right to a private and family life. On 24 September 2014, the German Ethics Council recommended that the government abolish laws criminalizing incest between siblings, arguing that such bans impinge upon citizens.

Some societies differentiate between full-sibling and half-sibling relations.

==== Cousin relationships ====
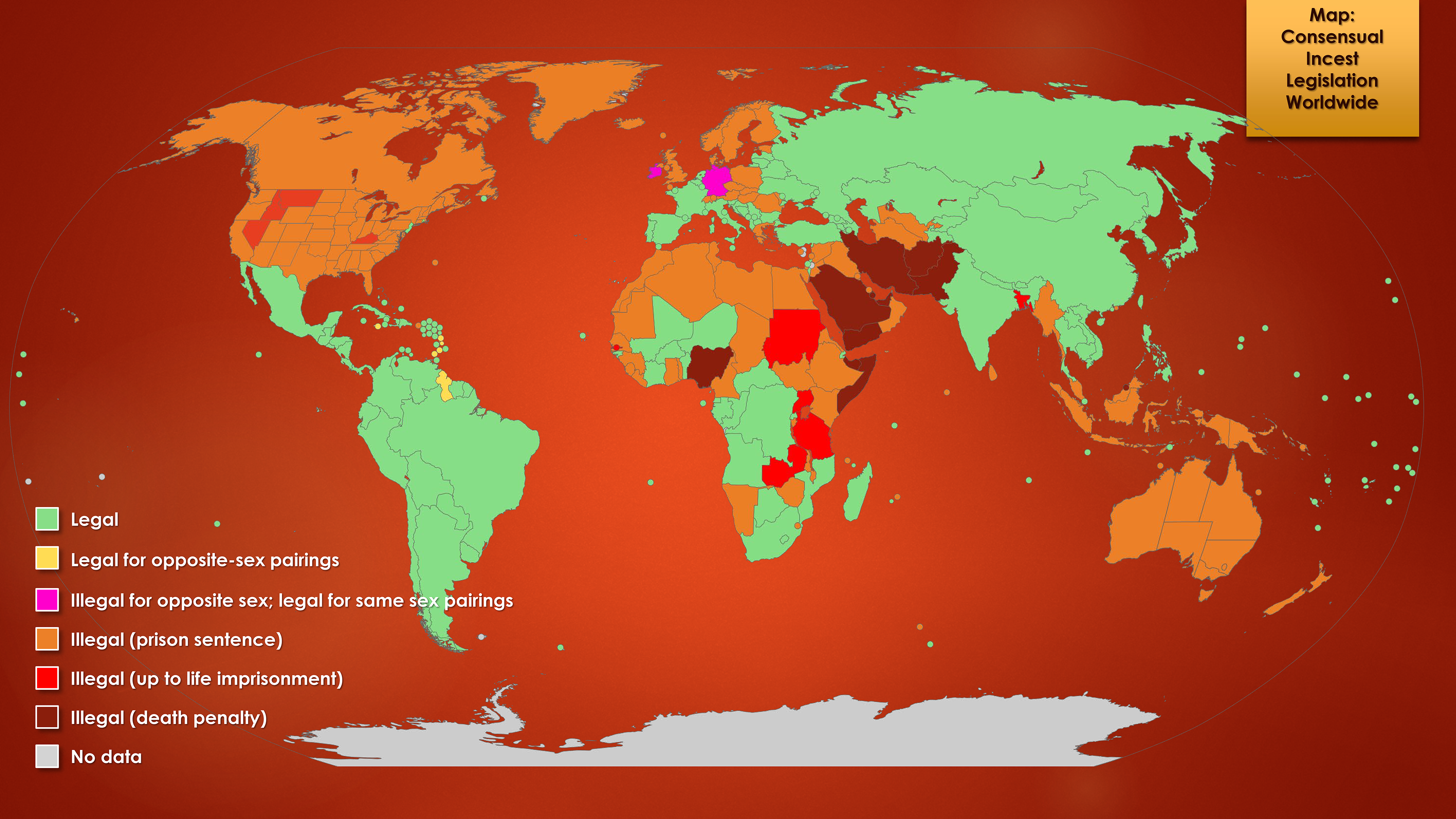
Legal status of incest, globally

Marriages and sexual relationships between first cousins are stigmatized as incest in some cultures, but tolerated in much of the world. Currently, 24 US states prohibit marriages between first cousins, and another seven permit them only under special circumstances. The United Kingdom permits both marriage and sexual relations between first cousins.

In some non-Western societies, marriages between close biological relatives account for 20–60% of all marriages.

First- and second-cousin marriages are rare in Western Europe, North America, and Oceania, accounting for less than 1% of marriages, but reach 9% in South America, East Asia, and South Europe, and about 50% in regions of the Middle East, North Africa, and South Asia. Communities such as the Dhond and the Bhittani of Pakistan clearly prefer marriages between cousins due to the belief they ensure purity of the descent line, provide intimate knowledge of the spouses, and ensure that patrimony will not pass into the hands of "outsiders". Cross-cousin marriages are preferred among the Yanomami of Brazilian Amazonia, among many other tribal societies identified by anthropologists.

Laws regarding first-cousin marriage in the States Legal Allowed with requirements Banned with exceptions^{1} Statute bans marriage^{1} Criminal offense^{1}^{1} Some states recognize marriages performed elsewhere, while other states do not.

There are some cultures in Asia which stigmatize cousin marriage, in some instances even marriages between second cousins or more remotely related people. This is notably true in the culture of Korea. In South Korea, before 1997, two people with the same last name and clan were prohibited from marrying. In light of this law being held unconstitutional, South Korea now only prohibits up to third cousins (see Article 809 of the Korean Civil Code). Hmong culture prohibits the marriage of anyone with the same last name – to do so would result in being shunned by the entire community, and they are usually stripped of their last name.

In a review of 48 studies of children parented by cousins, the rate of birth defects was twice that of non-related couples: 4% for cousin couples as opposed to 2% for the general population.

==== Defined through marriage ====
Some cultures include relatives by marriage in incest prohibitions; these relationships are called affinity rather than consanguinity. For example, the question of the legality and morality of a widower who wished to marry his deceased wife's sister was the subject of long and fierce debate in the United Kingdom in the 19th century, involving, among others, Matthew Boulton and Charles La Trobe. The marriages were entered into in Scotland and Switzerland respectively, where they were legal. In medieval Europe, Lateran IV ruled that standing as a godparent to a child also created a bond of affinity; which precluded legal marriage. But in other societies, a deceased spouse's sibling was considered the ideal person to marry. The Hebrew Bible forbids a man from marrying his brother's widow with the exception that, if his brother dies childless, the man is required to marry his brother's widow so as to "raise up seed to him". Some societies have long practiced sororal polygyny, a form of polygamy in which a man marries multiple wives who are sisters to each other (though not closely related to him).

In Islamic law, marriage among close blood relations like parents, stepparents, parents in-law, siblings, stepsiblings, the children of siblings, aunts, and uncles is forbidden, while first or second cousins may marry. Marrying the widow of a brother or the sister of a deceased or divorced wife is also allowed.

== Inbreeding ==
Offspring of biologically related parents are subject to the possible impact of inbreeding. Such offspring have a higher possibility of congenital birth defects (see Coefficient of relationship), because it increases the proportion of zygotes that are homozygous for deleterious recessive alleles that produce such disorders (see Inbreeding depression). Because most such alleles are rare in populations, it is unlikely that two unrelated marriage partners will both be heterozygous carriers. However, because close relatives share a large fraction of their alleles, the probability that any such rare deleterious allele present in the common ancestor will be inherited from both related parents is increased dramatically with respect to non-inbred couples. Contrary to common belief, inbreeding does not in itself alter allele frequencies, but rather increases the relative proportion of homozygotes to heterozygotes. This has two contrary effects:

- In the short term, because incestuous reproduction increases zygosity, deleterious recessive alleles will express themselves more frequently, leading to increases in spontaneous abortions of zygotes, perinatal deaths, and postnatal offspring with birth defects.
- In the long run, however, because of this increased exposure of deleterious recessive alleles to natural selection, their frequency decreases more rapidly in inbred population, leading to a "healthier" population (with fewer deleterious recessive alleles).

The closer the relationship between two persons, the higher the zygosity, and thus the more severe the biological costs of inbreeding. This fact probably explains why inbreeding between close relatives, such as siblings, is less common than inbreeding between cousins.

There may also be other deleterious effects besides those caused by recessive diseases. Thus, similar immune systems may be more vulnerable to infectious diseases (see Major histocompatibility complex and sexual selection).

A 1994 study found a mean excess mortality with inbreeding among first cousins of 4.4%. A 2008 study also found decreased lifespan among offspring of first cousins, but no difference between lifespans after the second cousin level. A 1990 study conducted in South India found that the incidence of malformations was slightly higher in uncle-niece progeny (9.34%) compared to the first cousin progeny (6.18%). Stillbirth rates were significantly higher among consanguineous couples irrespective of the mother's socioeconomic status, and were higher in uncle-niece mating's compared to first cousin and beyond first cousin unions in both the poor and middle/upper class. Children of parent–child or sibling–sibling unions are at increased risk compared to cousin–cousin unions. Studies suggest that 20–36% of these children will die or have major disability due to the inbreeding. A study of 29 offspring resulting from brother–sister or father–daughter incest found that 20 had congenital abnormalities, including four directly attributable to autosomal recessive alleles.

== Laws ==
Laws regarding sexual activity between close relatives vary considerably between jurisdictions, and depend on the type of sexual activity and the nature of the family relationship of the parties involved, as well as the age and sex of the parties. Prohibition of incest laws may extend to restrictions on marriage rights, which also vary between jurisdictions. Most jurisdictions prohibit parent–child and sibling marriages, while others also prohibit first-cousin and uncle–niece and aunt–nephew marriages. In most places, incest is illegal, regardless of the ages of the two partners. In other countries, incestuous relationships between consenting adults (with the age varying by location) are permitted, including in the Netherlands, France, Slovenia, and Spain. Sweden is the only country that allows marriage between half-siblings, and they must seek government counseling before getting to the marriage.

While the legality of consensual incest depends on the country which you live in, sexual assault committed against a close term relative is seen as a very serious crime in most countries. In some legal systems, the fact of a perpetrator being a close relative to the victim constitutes an aggravating circumstance in the case of any kinds of sexual crimes such as rape and sexual conduct with a minor – this is the case in Romania.

Even false depictions of incest are sometimes illegal. The Crime and Policing Act 2026 banned pornography in the United Kingdom featuring sexual roleplay involving people pretending to be closely related.

== Religious and philosophical views ==
=== Judaism ===
Jewish views on incest are mixed, with some scholars finding support in modern times only for the case of Jewish survival and genetic purity/preservation. The first religious resource found that prohibits incest, is the Torah, in book of Leviticus, chapter 18, "the children of Israel" – Israelite men and women alike – are forbidden from sexual relations between people who are "near of kin" (verse 6), who are defined as:

- Children and their mothers (verse 7);
- Siblings and half-siblings (verses 9 and 11). Relationships between these are particularly singled out for a curse in Deuteronomy 27, and they are of the only two kinds of incestuous relationships that are among the particularly singled-out relationships – with the other particularly singled-out relationships being ones of non-incestuous family betrayal (cf. verse 20) and bestiality (cf. verse 21);
- Grandparents and grandchildren (verse 10);
- Aunts and nephews, uncles and nieces, etc. (verses 12–14). Relationships between these are the second kind of relationships that are particularly singled out for a curse in Deuteronomy 27, and the explicit examples of children-in-law and mothers-in-law (verse 23) serve to remind the Israelites that the parents-in-law are also (or at least should also be) the children-in-law's aunts and uncles:

And Moses commanded the children of Israel according to the word of the LORD, saying: 'The tribe of the sons of Joseph speaketh right. This is the thing which the LORD hath commanded concerning the daughters of Zelophehad, saying: Let them be married to whom they think best; only into the family of the tribe of their father shall they be married. So shall no inheritance of the children of Israel remove from tribe to tribe; for the children of Israel shall cleave every one to the inheritance of the tribe of his fathers. And every daughter, that possesseth an inheritance in any tribe of the children of Israel, shall be wife unto one of the family of the tribe of her father, that the children of Israel may possess every man the inheritance of his fathers. So shall no inheritance remove from one tribe to another tribe; for the tribes of the children of Israel shall cleave each one to its own inheritance.' Even as the LORD commanded Moses, so did the daughters of Zelophehad. For Mahlah, Tirzah, and Hoglah, and Milcah, and Noah, the daughters of Zelophehad, were married unto their father's brothers' sons.

Incestuous relationships, along with the other forbidden relationships that are mentioned in Leviticus 18, are considered so severe among chillulim HaShem, acts which bring shame to the name of God, as to be punishable by death as specified in Leviticus 20.

In the 4th century BC, the Soferim (scribes) declared that there were relationships within which marriage constituted incest, in addition to those mentioned by the Torah. These additional relationships were termed seconds (Hebrew: sheniyyot) and included the wives of a man's grandfather and grandson. The classical rabbis prohibited marriage between a man and any of these seconds of his, on the basis that doing so would act as a safeguard against infringing the biblical incest rules, although there was inconclusive debate about exactly what the limits should be for the definition of seconds.

Marriages that are forbidden in the Torah (with the exception of uncle–niece marriages) were regarded by the rabbis of the Middle Ages as invalid – as if they had never occurred; any children born to such a couple were regarded as bastards under Jewish law, and the relatives of the spouse were not regarded as forbidden relations for further marriage. On the other hand, relationships that were prohibited due to qualifying as seconds and so forth were regarded as wicked but still valid; while such a couple may have been pressured to divorce, any children of the union were still seen as legitimate.

=== Christianity ===
The New Testament condemns relations between a man "and his father's wife" (1 Corinthians 5:1–5). Protestant Christians who adopt the Old Testament as part of their rule of faith and practice distinguish between the ceremonial law and the moral law given to Moses, with the demands of the ceremonial law being fulfilled by Christ's atoning death. Protestants view Leviticus 18:6–20 as part of the moral law and still applicable, thus condemning sexual/marriage relations between a man and his mother, sister, stepsister, or stepmother (if a man has more than one wife, it is forbidden for a son to have relations with or marry any of his father's wives), aunt, granddaughter, or his brother's wife. Leviticus 18 goes on to condemn relations between a man and the daughter of a woman he is having relations with and the sister of a woman he has had sexual relations with while the first sister is still alive.

The Book of Common Prayer of the Anglican Communion allows marriages up to and including first cousins.

The Catholic Church regards incest as a sin against the Sacrament of Matrimony. For the Catholic Church, at the heart of the immorality of incest is the corruption and disordering of proper family relations. These disordered relationships take on a particularly grave and immoral character when it becomes child sexual abuse.

As the Catechism of the Catholic Church says:

2388 Incest designates intimate relations between relatives or in-laws within a degree that prohibits marriage between them. St. Paul stigmatizes this especially grave offense: 'It is actually reported that there is immorality among you...for a man is living with his father's wife...In the name of the Lord Jesus...you are to deliver this man to Satan for the destruction of the flesh....' Incest corrupts family relationships and marks a regression toward animality. 2389 Connected to incest is any sexual abuse perpetrated by adults on children or adolescents entrusted to their care. The offense is compounded by the scandalous harm done to the physical and moral integrity of the young, who will remain scarred by it all their lives; and the violation of responsibility for their upbringing.

=== Islam ===
Islam strongly prohibits and outlaws inbreeding and incest, which is regarded as traits of the "Jahiliyyah" generations (Uneducated/Ignorant Generation). The Quran gives specific rules condemning incest, which prohibit a human from marrying or having sexual relationships with:

- his sister, his half-sister, a woman who has nursed from the same woman as him, and his sister-in-law (wife's sister) while still married. Half relations are as sacred as full relations;
- his daughter, his stepdaughter (if the marriage to her mother was consummated), his daughter-in-law.
- his niece (child of sibling);
- either parent's sister (aunt);

Cousin marriage is discouraged. Historically especially before Islam, in certain regions, widespread in the Middle East.

Although Islam does not specifically cite punishments for cousin marriage, there are hadiths attributed to Muhammad calling for distance from the marriage of relatives.

=== Zoroastrian ===
In Ancient Persia, incest between cousins is a blessed virtue, although, in some sources, incest is believed to be related to that of parent–child or brother–sister. Under Zoroastrianism, royalty, clergy, and commoners practiced incest, though the extent in the lattermost class was unknown. This tradition was called Xwedodah (Avestan: Xᵛaētuuadaθa). The tradition was considered so sacred that the bodily fluids produced by an incestuous couple were thought to have curative powers. For instance, the Vendidad advised corpse-bearers to purify themselves with a mixture of the urine of a married incestuous couple. Friedrich Nietzsche, in his book The Birth of Tragedy, cited that among Zoroastrians, a wise priest is born only by Xvaetvadatha.

To what extent Xvaetvadatha was practiced in Sasanian Iran and before – especially outside the royal and noble families ("dynastic incest") and, perhaps, the clergy – and whether practices ascribed to them can be assumed to be characteristic of the general population is not clear. There is a lack of genealogies and census material on the frequency of Xvaetvadatha. Evidence from Dura-Europos, however, combined with that of the Jewish and Christian sources citing actual cases under the Sasanians, strengthens the evidence of the Zoroastrian texts. In the post-Sasanian Zoroastrian literature, Xvaetvadatha is said to refer to marriages between cousins instead, which have always been relatively common. It has been observed that such incestuous acts received a great deal of glorification as a religious practice and, in addition to being condemned by foreigners (though the reliability of these accusations is questionable since accusations of incest were a common way of denigrating other groups), were considered a great challenge by their own proponents, with accounts suggesting that four copulations was deemed a rare achievement worthy of eternal salvation. It has been suggested that because taking up incestuous relations was a great personal challenge, seemingly repugnant even to Zoroastrians of the time, it served as an honest signal of commitment and devotion to religious ideals.

=== Hinduism ===
Rigveda regards incest to be "evil". Hinduism speaks of incest in abhorrent terms. Hindus believe there are both karmic and practical bad effects of incest and thus practice strict rules of both endogamy and exogamy in relation to the family tree (gotra) or bloodline (Pravara). Marriage within the gotra (swagotra marriage) is banned under the rule of exogamy in the traditional matrimonial system. People within the gotra are regarded as kin, and marrying such a person would be thought of as incest. Marriage with paternal cousins (a form of parallel-cousin relationship) is strictly prohibited. Traditional Hindu laws of marriage suggest that, between a man and a woman who are about to marry, there should be no common ancestor (gotra) between the groom and the bride for up to 6 generations on the father's side of the groom and bride and up to 4 generations on the mothers' side of the groom and bride. Some orthodox Hindus might extend this limit to up to 8 generations on the father's side and six generations on the mother's side (for both the bride and groom).

Although marriages between persons having the same gotra are generally frowned upon, how this is defined may vary regionally. Depending on the culture and caste of the population in the region, marriage may be restricted up to seven generations of gotra of father, mother, and grandmother. Marriage is banned within the same local community in a few rural areas.

=== Stoicism ===
The founder of Stoicism, Zeno of Citium, stated that incest was permissible in Republic, as did the later prominent Stoic philosopher Chrysippus. However, Zeno only advocates for incest under unique circumstances, such as procreating with one's ailing mother to beget "glorious" children, thus comforting her. Otherwise, incest is condemned as being contrary to Nature. Zeno further condemns incest from a moral and psychological perspective, considering it to be a sign of Plato's tyrannical soul, defined as a soul that is governed by illimitable desire. He uses Oedipus as a tragic example. Nonetheless, later Stoic disciples by the 1st century BC downplayed the pro-incest advocacy, accusing Zeno of being "young and thoughtless" when he wrote Republic.

== Other ==
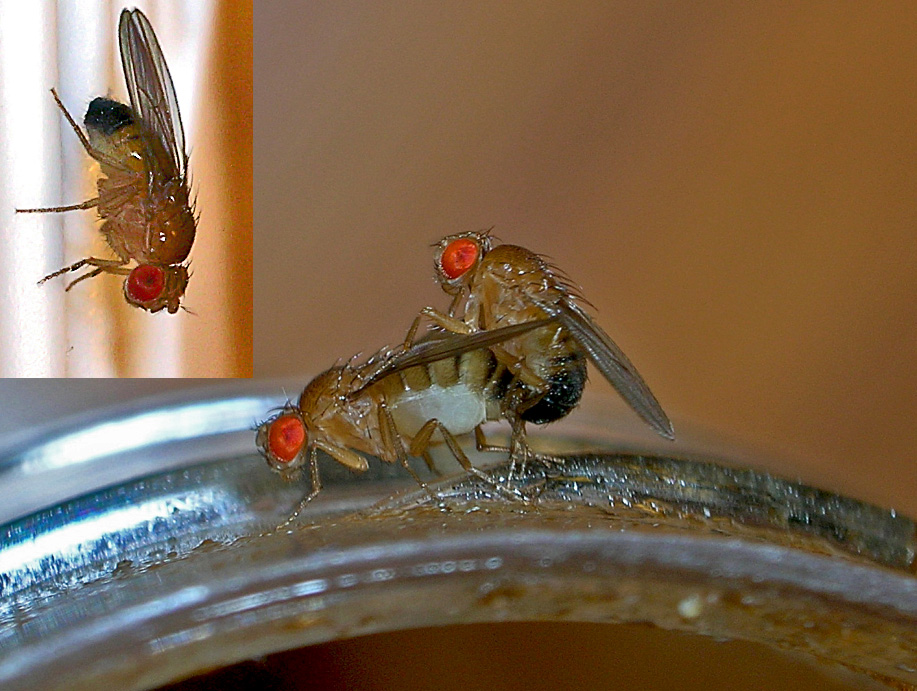
Common fruit fly females prefer to mate with their own brothers over unrelated males.

Inbreeding avoidance is rare in non-human animals. North Carolina State University found that bed bugs, in contrast to most other insects, tolerate inbreeding and are able to genetically withstand its effects quite well.

Many species of mammals, including humanity's closest primate relatives, tend to avoid mating with close relatives, especially if there are alternative partners available. However, some chimpanzees have been recorded attempting to mate with their mothers. Male rats have been recorded engaging in mating with their sisters, but they tend to prefer non-related females over their sisters.

Livestock breeders often practice controlled breeding to eliminate undesirable characteristics within a population, which is also coupled with the culling of what is considered unfit offspring, especially when trying to establish a new and desirable trait in the stock.

== See also ==
- Accidental incest
- Adelphogamy
- Avunculate marriage
- Genetic distance
- Genetic diversity
- Genetic sexual attraction
- Inbreeding
- Incest between twins
- Incest taboo
- Incest in folklore and mythology
- Incest in literature
- Incest in media
- List of coupled siblings
- Prohibited degree of kinship
- Proximity of blood
- Sibling relationship § Sibling marriage and incest
- Watta satta
- Westermarck effect which prevents most incest
