= Imprinting (psychology) =

Kinds of learning occurring at a particular age or a particular life stage

In psychology and ethology, imprinting is a relatively rapid learning process that occurs during a particular developmental phase of life and leads to corresponding behavioural adaptations. The term originally was used to describe situations in which an animal internalises (learns) the characteristics of a perceived object, for example of a dangerous predator or a sweet fruit.

Sigmund Freud, the founder of psychoanalysis, provided the first scientific explanation of how imprinting really works, developing the thesis that our brain can store experiences in its neural network through "a permanent change after an event" – one of the main functions of the long-term memory, which he called superego. Shaped by social experiences during childhood, this instance is connected to the ego (consciousness) which is necessary for controlling behaviour in order to satisfy a series of innate needs. Ultimately the imprinted superego performs the function of conscience, which makes aware of two types of feelings: warnings not to repeat wrong decisions; and anticipation of the repeated experience of satisfaction.

Even in ancient times, philosophers pondered the material properties that would be necessary for the function of ‘remembering’ and the learning process as such. To illustrate this, they imagined a kind of writing tablet in the brain, which was like soft clay and remained blank until an experience was mechanically ‘imprinted’ onto it.

== Filial imprinting ==
In humans and other higher animals it is chiefly the limbic structures of the brain that embody the long-term memory shaped by experiences. The best-known form of imprinting is that of small children and young animals, who limit their social preferences to their conspecifics – usually their mother first – after coming into contact with them. This so called filial imprinting is most obvious in nidifugous birds, which follow their parents around due to imprinting with their visual appearance, sounds and other behavioural expressions. It was first reported in domestic chickens by Sir Thomas More in 1516, as described in his treatise Utopia. It was rediscovered 350 years later by the 19th-century amateur biologist Douglas Spalding, and again in the 20th century by the early ethologist Oskar Heinroth; it was studied extensively and popularized by his disciple Konrad Lorenz working with greylag geese.

Lorenz demonstrated how incubator-hatched geese would imprint on the first suitable moving stimulus they saw within what he called a "critical period" between 13 and 16 hours shortly after hatching. For example, the goslings would imprint on Lorenz himself (to be more specific, on his wading boots), and he is often depicted being followed by a gaggle of geese who had imprinted on him. Lorenz also found that the geese could imprint on inanimate objects. In one notable experiment, they followed a box placed on a model train in circles around the track. Filial imprinting is not restricted to non-human animals that are able to follow their parents, however.

The filial imprinting of birds was a primary technique used to create the movie Winged Migration (Le Peuple Migrateur), which contains a great deal of footage of migratory birds in flight. The birds imprinted on handlers, who wore yellow jackets and honked horns constantly. The birds were then trained to fly along with a variety of aircraft, primarily ultralights.

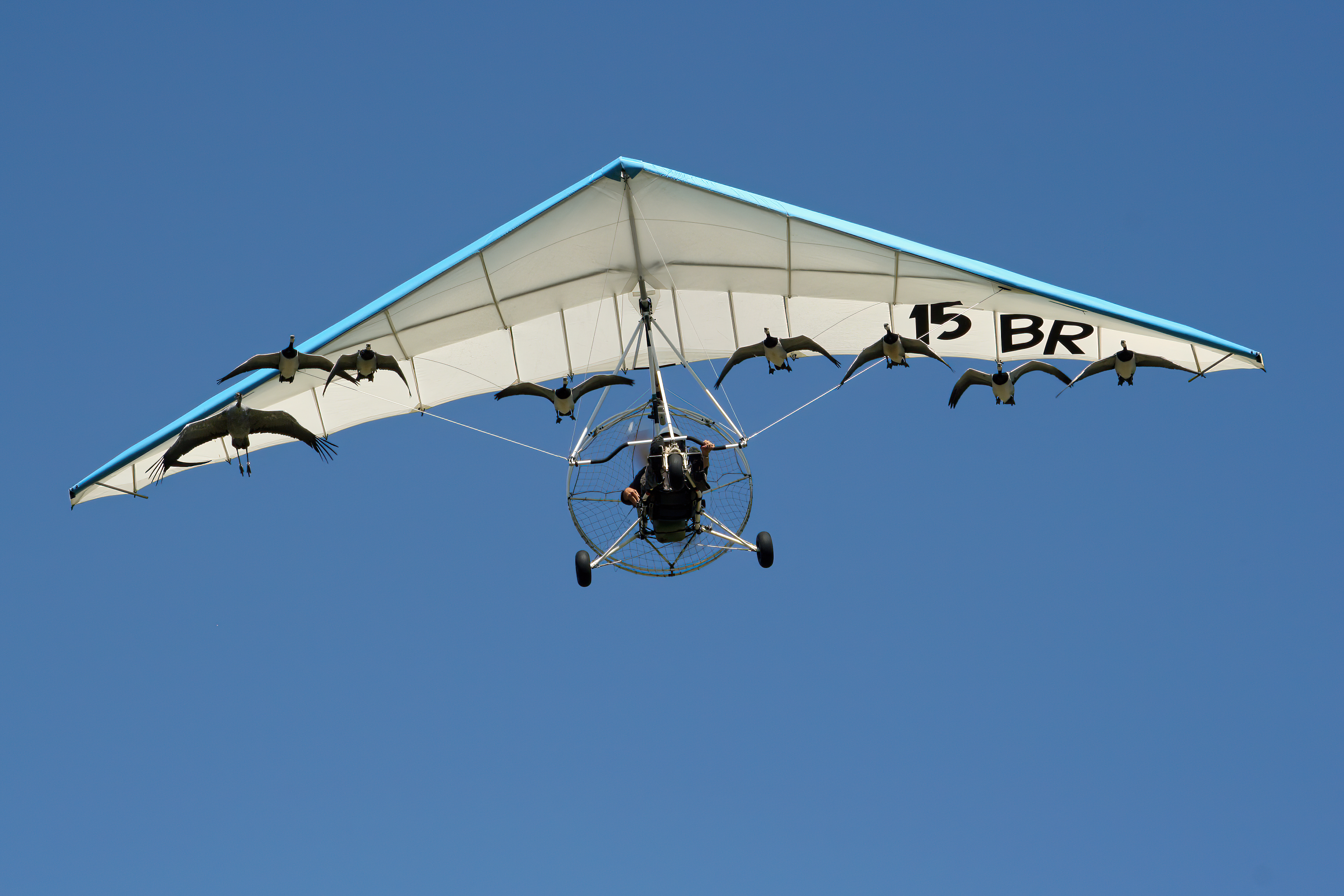
Imprinted Canada geese (Branta canadensis) and common crane (Grus grus) flying with an ultralight aircraft

The Italian hang-glider pilot Angelo d'Arrigo extended this technique. D'Arrigo noted that the flight of a non-motorised hang-glider is very similar to the flight patterns of migratory birds; both use updrafts of hot air (thermal currents) to gain altitude that then permits soaring flight over distance. He used this to reintroduce threatened species of raptors. Because birds hatched in captivity have no mentor birds to teach them traditional migratory routes, D'Arrigo hatched chicks under the wing of his glider and they imprinted on him. Then, he taught the fledglings to fly and to hunt. The young birds followed him not only on the ground (as with Lorenz) but also in the air as he took the path of various migratory routes. He flew across the Sahara and over the Mediterranean Sea to Sicily with eagles, from Siberia to Iran (5,500 km) with a flock of Siberian cranes, and over Mount Everest with Nepalese eagles. In 2006, he worked with a condor in South America.

In a similar project, orphaned Canada geese were trained to their normal migration route by the Canadian ultralight enthusiast Bill Lishman, as shown in the fact-based movie drama Fly Away Home.

Chicks of domestic chickens prefer to be near large groups of objects that they have imprinted on. This behaviour was used to determine that very young chicks of a few days old have rudimentary counting skills. In a series of experiments, they were made to imprint on plastic balls and could figure out which of two groups of balls hidden behind screens had the most balls.

American coot mothers have the ability to recognize their chicks by imprinting on cues from the first chick that hatches. This allows mothers to distinguish their chicks from parasitic chicks.

It commonly occurs in falconry birds reared from hatching by humans. Such birds are called "imprints" in falconry. The advantages of imprinting raptors on man have been realized by many for years. Imprinted captors can be used for educational purposes and research, and in captive breeding.

The peregrine falcon has also been known to imprint on specific structures for their breeding grounds such as cliff sides and bridges and thus will favour that location for breeding.

== Sexual imprinting ==
Sexual imprinting is the process by which a young animal learns the characteristics of a desirable mate. For example, male zebra finches appear to prefer mates with the appearance of the female bird that rears them.

Sexual attraction to humans can develop in non-human mammals or birds as a result of sexual imprinting when reared from young by humans. One example is London Zoo female giant panda Chi Chi. When taken to Moscow Zoo for mating with the male giant panda An An, she refused his attempts to mate with her, but made a full sexual self-presentation to a zookeeper.

In falconry, when an imprint must be bred from, the breeder lets the male bird copulate with their head while they are wearing a special hat with pockets to catch the male bird's semen. The breeder then courts a suitable imprint female bird (including offering food, if it is part of that species's normal courtship). At "copulation", the breeder puts the flat of one hand on the female bird's back to represent the weight of a male bird, and with the other hand uses a pipette, or a hypodermic syringe without a needle, to squirt the semen into the female's cloaca. A human-imprinted kākāpō named Sirocco attained fame after attempting to mate with zoologist Mark Carwardine in an episode of the BBC television series Last Chance to See.

Sexual imprinting on inanimate objects is a popular theory concerning the development of sexual fetishism. For example, according to this theory, imprinting on shoes or boots (as with Konrad Lorenz's geese) would be the cause of shoe fetishism.

== Limbic imprinting ==
The neurological branch of psychoanalysis and other areas of research, have recently provided evidence that prenatal and early childhood experiences shape the specialised limbic system (located nearly in the brain's centre). The result of this imprinting process, which partially irreversibly alters the neural structure of the brain, is also referred to as the ‘emotional map’ of human being. This is because the limbic system combines the impressions stored in it with deeply rooted beliefs and values that determine conscious thinking and behaviour from the subconscious realm of the entire organism. This is one of the proposed explanations for the well-founded finding that a person's childhood ‘formative’ experiences contribute decisively to their further psychological development. Referring to psychoanalysis, a traumatic imprint can only be therapeutically influenced to the extent that its causal background is conscious to the perceiving "ego"-instance of the human soul. Modern neurology has located the highest focus of ego-conscious activity in the frontal lobe of the human brain. This area therefore interacts functionally as closely with the memory performance of the limbus (superego) as it does with the set of natural needs and values conveyed 'upwards' from the brain stem. Even more fundamentally, these are anchored as potentials in the human genome. Imprinted genes can have astounding effects on body size, brain size, and the process in which the brain organizes its processes. Evolutionary trends within the animal kingdom have been shown to show substantive increase in the forebrain particularly towards the limbic system. This evolution has even been thought of to have a mutative effect on the brain size trickling down the human ancestry.

== Westermarck effect ==
Reverse sexual imprinting is also seen in instances where two people who live in domestic proximity during the first few years in the life of either one become desensitized to later close sexual attraction to each other. This phenomenon, known as the Westermarck effect, was first formally described by Finnish anthropologist Edvard Westermarck in his book The History of Human Marriage (1891). The Westermarck effect has since been observed in many places and cultures, including in the Israeli kibbutz system, and the Chinese shim-pua marriage customs, as well as in biologically related families.

In the case of the Israeli kibbutzim (collective farms), children were reared somewhat communally in peer groups, based on age, not biological relation. A study of the marriage patterns of these children later in life revealed that out of the nearly 3,000 marriages that occurred across the kibbutz system, only fourteen were between children from the same peer group. Of those fourteen, none had been reared together during the first six years of life. This result provides evidence not only that the Westermarck effect is demonstrable but that it operates during the period from birth to the age of six. However, Eran Shor and Dalit Simchai claimed that the case of the kibbutzim actually provides little support for the Westermarck effect.

When proximity during this critical period does not occur—for example, where a brother and sister are brought up separately, never meeting one another—they may find one another highly sexually attractive when they meet as adults. This phenomenon is known as genetic sexual attraction. This observation supports the hypothesis that the Westermarck effect evolved because it suppressed inbreeding. This attraction may also be seen with cousin couples.

Sigmund Freud argued that as children, members of the same family naturally lust for one another, making it necessary for societies to create incest taboos, but Westermarck argued the reverse, that the taboos themselves arise naturally as products of innate attitudes. Steven Pinker has written that Freud's conception of an urge to incest may have derived from Freud's own erotic reaction to his mother as a boy (attested in Freud's own writings), and speculates that Freud's reaction may have been due to lack of intimacy with his mother in early childhood, as Freud was wet-nursed.

== Baby duck syndrome ==
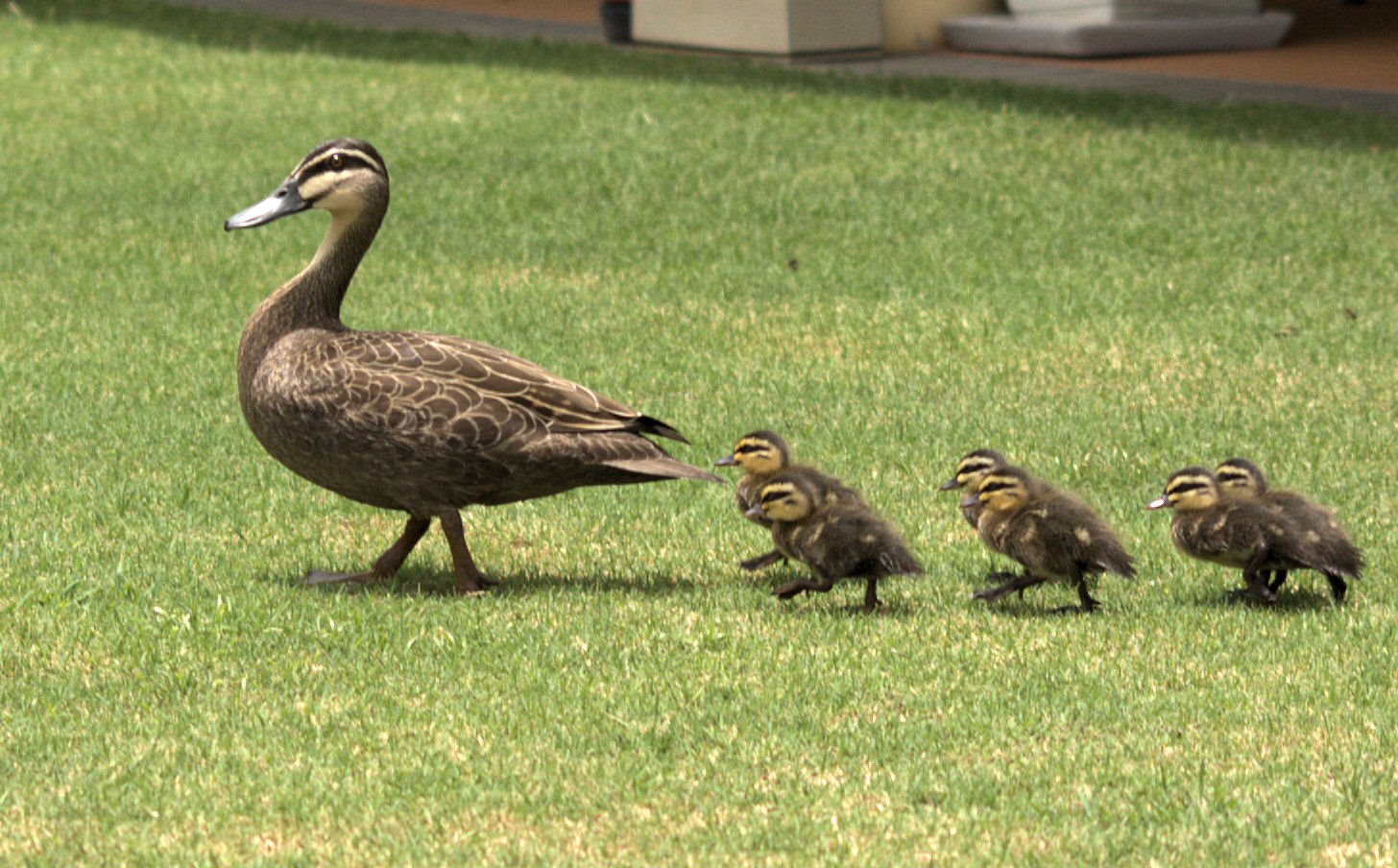
Ducklings following their mother

In human–computer interaction, baby duck syndrome denotes the tendency for computer users to "imprint" on the first system they learn, then judge other systems by their similarity to that first system. The result is that "users generally prefer systems similar to those they learned on and dislike unfamiliar systems". The issue may present itself relatively early in a computer user's experience, and it has been observed to impede education of students in new software systems or user interfaces.

== See also ==
- Attachment theory
- Imprinting (organizational theory)
- Kin recognition
- Kin selection
- Ivan Pavlov
- Psychical inertia
