= Marriage dispute =

Marriage dispute may refer to disagreements, often legal, regarding marriage. Disputes may be personal, familial, cultural or social, religious, legal, political, as well as regarding individual marriages and their details.

- Arranged marriage
- Child marriage
- Divorce
- Endogamy and exogamy
- Engagement
- Forced marriage
- Incest taboo (affinity (law))
- Interfaith marriage
- Interracial marriage
- Marriage law
  - Annulment
  - Civil marriage
- Polygamy and monogamy
  - Polyandry
  - Polygyny)
- Same-sex marriage
