= Accidental incest =

Sexual activity between persons unaware of a family relationship

Accidental incest is sexual activity or marriage between persons who were unaware of a family relationship between them which would be considered incestuous.

The laws of many jurisdictions void incestuous marriages, even if entered into without awareness of the kinship. If an incestuous relationship is suspected, DNA testing may be used. Some jurisdictions permit offspring of IVF donations access to donation records or to adoption records.

== Causes ==
People may be unaware of a kinship relationship between them in a number of circumstances. For example, artificial insemination with an anonymous donated sperm may result in offspring being unaware of any biological relations, such as paternity or half siblings. To reduce the likelihood of accidental incest, fertility clinics usually limit the number of times that a donor's sperm may be used. Some countries have laws limiting the number of children a donor can father, while others limit sperm donations based on family numbers to enable one family to have true siblings.

Taiwan allows those conceived by artificial means to find out if they are related to a person they are considering marrying.

Accidental incest may also arise in the following situations:

- Children separated from their family at birth
- Child abandonment
- Non-paternity event
- Sexual exploration

Genetic sexual attraction is an unproven hypothesis, considered by some to be offered without proof as an explanation for cases of sexual attraction and relations between adults who were not aware of their close blood relations.

== Notable cases ==
In 2008, during a debate on the Human Fertilisation and Embryology Act 2008 in the House of Lords, Lord Alton of Liverpool claimed that a British brother and sister, who were twins separated at birth, married without knowing of their relationship. According to Lord Alton, the relationship was discovered soon after their wedding, and the marriage was annulled. The case was raised regarding whether adoptions should be kept secret. Questions were raised about whether the story is actually true, as Lord Alton was known to oppose the act due to its provision allowing the creation and use of animal-human hybrid stem cells for medical purposes.

An engaged couple in South Africa, who had been together for five years and were expecting a child, discovered that they were brother and sister just before their wedding. They were raised separately and met as adults in college. Just before the wedding, their parents met and they came to realize that they were siblings. The couple broke off the relationship after the discovery.

== In fiction ==
- The plot and eventual climax of Oedipus Rex revolves around accidental incest. Oedipus, raised by an adoptive mother who he believes is his biological mother, is given a prophecy that he will someday marry his mother. As Oedipus believes this is referring to his adoptive mother, not his biological mother, he runs away and gets caught up in the politics of Thebes and ends up marrying the recently widowed queen of Thebes, Jocasta. At the climax of the play it is revealed to both characters and the audience that Oedipus is Jocasta's son and they have been accidentally committing an incestuous relationship.
- In Daniel Defoe's novel Moll Flanders (1722) the title character, having been adopted at the age of three, unwittingly marries her half-brother and has three children by him before meeting her mother-in-law who she discovers to be her own biological mother, making her husband her half-brother.
- The manga Koi Kaze (2001) is about the incestuous relationship between brother and sister, Koshiro and Nanoka. Koshiro's romantic attraction to Nanoka is initiated when neither sibling yet knows about their blood relation.
- In Oldboy (2003) and its 2013 remake, the protagonist has an intimate incestuous relationship with his daughter. He does not recognize her, as he was abducted and locked in a small room for 15 years (20 years in the remake).
- In Star Wars, the main character Luke Skywalker has a romantic interest in Princess Leia, who unbeknownst to him is his sister, as they were separated following the death of their mother, Padmé Amidala.
- In the show Arrested Development, Maeby briefly dates Steve Holt, a popular student at her high school. However, it is later revealed that an affair Maeby's uncle, Gob, had in high school resulted in Steve's birth. The show has various storylines relating to incest played for comedy, such as Maeby and her cousin, George Michael having a mutual romantic attraction, mistakenly believing Maeby is adopted; and Lindsey, Maeby's mother, briefly develops romantic feelings for her brother after learning she is not biologically related to him.

== See also ==
- Absalom, Absalom!
- Andorra (play)
- Íslendingabók (genealogical database)
- Moll Flanders
- Mordred
- Oedipus Rex
- Os Maias
- Westermarck effect
- Yrsa
- Kullervo and his sister
- Túrin Turambar
