= Eran Shor =

Israeli-Canadian sociologist (born 1974)

- ערן שור
- Born: 1974 (age 51–52)

Academic background
- Education: Stony Brook University, University of Haifa, Israel

Academic work
- Discipline: Sociologist
- Institutions: McGill University

Eran Shor (Hebrew: ערן שור) is an Israeli-Canadian sociologist and a Professor of Sociology. He is the William Dawson Scholar at McGill University. His research interests include the causes and effects of political conflict and violence, ethnicity and nationalism, the sociology of health, and the media coverage of women and ethnic minorities. He focuses on the relationship between states’ counterterrorist policies and their respect for human rights and civil liberties. His research methods include computational analysis of big data, cross-national regression analysis and meta-analyses, as well as in-depth qualitative methods and content analysis.

== Research ==
Shor has published more than 50 articles, including many in peer-reviewed journals such as American Sociological Review, American Journal of Sociology, Social Problems, Social Forces, Demography, Social Science Research, Social Networks, Ethnic and Racial Studies, American Journal of Epidemiology, International Journal of Epidemiology, Social Science & Medicine, Journal for the Scientific Study of Religion, Journal of Sex Research, Archives of Sexual Behavior and Violence Against Women.

His research findings, including on the longevity of fame, gender roles in the media, unemployment, and mortality, and family ties and mortality, have been discussed and published in multiple media and news sources.

=== Social conflict and violence ===
Shor studies the causes and consequences of political conflict and violence. He relies on comparative historical research and media content analysis to look at ethnic conflicts and tensions in countries with large minority populations, with a particular focus on the Israeli-Palestinian conflict. He also studies the factors that shape state counterterrorism policies, employing a combination of longitudinal time-series cross-national analyses and case studies.

His work demonstrates the importance of socio-cultural processes in determining state policies, and challenges traditional international relations approaches. For example, he found that counterterrorism legislation is primarily motivated by processes of policy diffusion and imitation, in particular spatial diffusion across bordering countries. He shows that such legislation typically has no effects in the short run and negative effects in the long run on both the level of terrorist attacks and respect for human and civil rights.

=== Media coverage of women and minorities ===
Shor uses qualitative content analysis of newspapers. He explores the policing, silencing, and marginalization of immigrants and ethnic minority groups in Canadian and Israeli media. He examines the reaffirmation and redrawing of national and collective boundaries through the exclusion of some ethnic minority groups. He studies mainstream media coverage of “honor killings” in both Canada and Israel, showing how labels often shape the ways in which journalists think about family murders and the type of motivations they ascribe to perpetrators.

In collaboration with Arnout van de Rijt and a group of computer scientists, he collected and analyzed data on millions of individuals from thousands of newspapers and other media over many decades. This work challenged seemingly axiomatic ideas of fame, gender and the media. One study questioned Andy Warhol’s idea of 15 minutes of fame, that is the idea that fame tends to be ephemeral. Shor showed that, in fact, famous people tend to remain famous for many years. In another study, Shor and colleagues show that men outnumber women by 5:1 in newspaper coverage. They demonstrate that having more women as executive editors or on editorial boards does not substantially affect these coverage patterns.

=== Sexual attraction and sexual violence ===
Shor researched the foundations of sexual attraction and sexual aversion. Shor and Dalit Simchai challenged the scholarly consensus on the Westermarck effect, which suggests that close domestic proximity during early childhood leads to sexual aversion (also known as reverse sexual imprinting). Shor and Simchai interviewed men and women who grew up in Israeli kibbutzim, showing that even those who were raised in close proximity were often attracted to one another. In contrast to common evolutionary psychology notions, the primary reason for the avoiding inbreeding among these individuals was fear of damaging group cohesion.

Shor looked at portrayals of sexual violence in mainstream internet pornography. In a study with Kimberly Seida, Shor found no consistent uptake in aggressive content of popular online pornographic videos over time. They found that violent porn is less likely to receive views and less likely to be favorably ranked. Instead, most viewers tend to prefer videos where women clearly express pleasure.

=== Stressful life events, social relationships, immigration and health ===
Together with David Roelfs, Shor explored the effects of stressful life events and of social relationships on health and mortality in a range of countries and under varying conditions. He employed primarily meta-analysis and meta-regression to re-examine relationships between life events, social support, migration and mortality. Findings include the reaffirmation of the harmful effects of unemployment on mortality, as well as research that shows that social support from family members is more beneficial to health than support from friends. They also found support for the healthy immigrant paradox, showing that immigrants have greater longevity than non-immigrants in their new country.

== Education ==
- PhD in Sociology, Stony Brook Un., NY, 2010;
- M.A. in Sociology, Stony Brook Un., NY, 2007;
- M.A. (magna cum laude) in Sociology, Un. Of Haifa, Israel, 2005;
- B.A. (magna cum laude) in Sociology & Psychology, Un. Of Haifa, Israel, 2003.

== Selected publications ==
=== Peer-reviewed journal publications ===
- Shor, Eran. “Why do They Legislate? A Cross-National Time-Series Analysis of Terrorism and Counterterrorist Legislation.” Social Problems 64:106-132. 2017.
- Shor, Eran; Roelfs, David; Vang, Zoua M. (August 2017). "The "Hispanic mortality paradox" revisited: Meta-analysis and meta-regression of life-course differentials in Latin American and Caribbean immigrants' mortality". Social Science & Medicine. 186: 20–33. doi:10.1016/j.socscimed.2017.05.049. ISSN 0277-9536. PMID 28577458.
- Shor, Eran (2016-07-29). "Counterterrorist Legislation and Subsequent Terrorism: Does it Work?". Social Forces. 95 (2): 525–557. doi:10.1093/sf/sow052. ISSN 0037-7732.
- Shier, Allie; Shor, Eran (2016-07-09). "Shades of Foreign Evil". Violence Against Women. 22 (10): 1163–1188. doi:10.1177/1077801215621176. ISSN 1077-8012. PMID 26712236. S2CID 3779765.
- Shor, Eran; Filkobski, Ina; Ben-Nun Bloom, Pazit; Alkilabi, Hayder; Su, William (July 2016). "Does counterterrorist legislation hurt human rights practices? A longitudinal cross-national analysis". Social Science Research. 58: 104–121. doi:10.1016/j.ssresearch.2015.12.007. ISSN 0049-089X. PMID 27194654.
- Shor, Eran, Arnout van de Rijt, Alex Miltsov*, Vivek Kulkarni*, and Steven Skiena. “A Paper Ceiling: What Explains the Sex-Ratio Inequality in Printed News Coverage?” American Sociological Review 80:960-984. 2015.
- Shor, Eran; Roelfs, David J. (March 2015). "Social contact frequency and all-cause mortality: A meta-analysis and meta-regression". Social Science & Medicine. 128: 76–86. doi:10.1016/j.socscimed.2015.01.010. ISSN 0277-9536. PMID 25594955.
- Yonay, Yuval; Shor, Eran (May 2014). "Ethnic Coexistence in Deeply Divided Societies: The Case of Arab Athletes in the Hebrew Media". The Sociological Quarterly. 55 (2): 396–420. doi:10.1111/tsq.12056. ISSN 0038-0253. S2CID 142671099.
- van de Rijt, Arnout; Shor, Eran; Ward, Charles; Skiena, Steven (2013-03-27). "Only 15 Minutes? The Social Stratification of Fame in Printed Media". American Sociological Review. 78 (2): 266–289. doi:10.1177/0003122413480362. ISSN 0003-1224. S2CID 17178599.
  - Winner of the 2014 Clifford Geertz Prize for Best Article, ASA’s Section on Culture
- Shor, Eran; Roelfs, David J.; Yogev, Tamar (October 2013). "The strength of family ties: A meta-analysis and meta-regression of self-reported social support and mortality". Social Networks. 35 (4): 626–638. doi:10.1016/j.socnet.2013.08.004. ISSN 0378-8733.
- Shor, Eran; Simchai, Dalit (March 2012). "Exposing the Myth of Sexual Aversion in the Israeli Kibbutzim: A Challenge to the Westermarck Hypothesis". American Journal of Sociology. 117 (5): 1509–1513. doi:10.1086/665522. ISSN 0002-9602. S2CID 96440106.
- Shor, Eran; Roelfs, David J.; Curreli, Misty; Clemow, Lynn; Burg, Matthew M.; Schwartz, Joseph E. (2012-03-17). "Widowhood and Mortality: A Meta-Analysis and Meta-Regression". Demography. 49 (2): 575–606. doi:10.1007/s13524-012-0096-x. ISSN 0070-3370. PMC 3640496. PMID 22427278.
- Roelfs, David J.; Shor, Eran; Kalish, Rachel; Yogev, Tamar (2011-06-29). "The Rising Relative Risk of Mortality for Singles: Meta-Analysis and Meta-Regression". American Journal of Epidemiology. 174 (4): 379–389. doi:10.1093/aje/kwr111. ISSN 1476-6256. PMID 21715646.
- Shor, Eran; Yonay, Yuval (2010-09-10). "'Play and shut up': the silencing of Palestinian athletes in Israeli media". Ethnic and Racial Studies. 34 (2): 229–247. doi:10.1080/01419870.2010.503811. ISSN 0141-9870. S2CID 145186844.
- Roelfs, David J.; Shor, Eran; Davidson, Karina W.; Schwartz, Joseph E. (March 2011). "Losing life and livelihood: A systematic review and meta-analysis of unemployment and all-cause mortality". Social Science & Medicine. 72 (6): 840–854. doi:10.1016/j.socscimed.2011.01.005. ISSN 0277-9536. PMC 3070776. PMID 21330027.
- Roelfs, D.; Shor, E.; Davidson, K.; Schwartz, J. (2010-08-19). "War-related stress exposure and mortality: a meta-analysis". International Journal of Epidemiology. 39 (6): 1499–1509. doi:10.1093/ije/dyq132. ISSN 0300-5771. PMC 2992629. PMID 20724455.
- Shor, Eran; Simchai, Dalit (May 2009). "Incest Avoidance, the Incest Taboo, and Social Cohesion: Revisiting Westermarck and the Case of the Israeli Kibbutzim". American Journal of Sociology. 114 (6): 1803–1842. doi:10.1086/597178. ISSN 0002-9602. PMID 19852254. S2CID 27854996.
- Shor, Eran (February 2008). "Conflict, Terrorism, and the Socialization of Human Rights Norms: The Spiral Model Revisited". Social Problems. 55 (1): 117–138. doi:10.1525/sp.2008.55.1.117. ISSN 0037-7791. S2CID 144945455.
