= William Clerke (writer) =

English writer

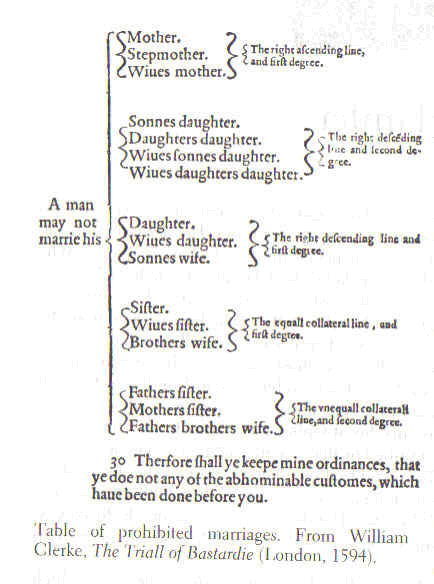
Table of prohibited marriages from The Trial of Bastardie.

William Clerke (fl. 1595) was an English writer.

== Life ==
Clerke matriculated as a sizar of Trinity College, Cambridge, in June 1575, became a scholar of that house, and in 1578-9 proceeded Bachelor of Arts. He was soon afterward elected a fellow of his college, and in 1582 he commenced Master of Arts. There was a William Clerke, possibly the same, who was admitted to St. Paul's School on the recommendation of Mr. Malyne, and who received money 3 June 1579 and 20 February 1579–80, on going to Cambridge, from Robert Nowel's estate.

== Works ==
He is the supposed author of:

- 'The Triall of Bastardie. ... Annexed at the end of this Treatise, touching the prohibition of Marriage, a Table of the Levitical, English, and Positive Canon Catalogues, their concordance and difference,' Lond. 1594, 4to.
- 'Polimanteia, or, the meanes lawfull and unlawfull, to judge of the fall of a Common-wealth against the frivolous and foolish conjectures of this age. Whereunto is added a letter from England to her three daughters, Cambridge, Oxford, Innes of Court, and to all the rest of her inhabitants, persuading them to a constant unitie of what religion soever they are ...' Cambridge, 1595, 4to.

The dedication to Robert Devereux, earl of Essex, is signed 'W. C.' It is now attributed to William Covell. In this very curious and interesting work mention is made of our old English writers, 'sweet Shakespeare,' Harvey, Nash, and 'divine Spenser.' It has been said that this is the earliest known publication in which William Shakespeare's name is mentioned; but it occurs previously in the commendatory verses prefixed to "Willobie His Avisa," 1594.
