= Incest taboo =

Cultural rule that prohibits incest

An incest taboo is any cultural rule or norm that prohibits sexual relations between certain members of the same family, mainly between individuals related by blood. All known human cultures have norms that exclude certain close relatives from those considered suitable or permissible sexual or marriage partners, making such relationships taboo. However, different norms exist among cultures as to which blood relations are permissible as sexual partners and which are not. Sexual relations between related persons which are subject to the taboo are called incestuous relationships.

Some cultures proscribe sexual relations between clan-members, even when no traceable biological relationship exists, while members of other clans are permissible irrespective of the existence of a biological relationship. In many cultures, certain types of cousin relations are preferred as sexual and marital partners, whereas in others these are taboo. Some cultures permit sexual and marital relations between aunts/uncles and nephews/nieces. In some instances, brother–sister marriages have been practised by the elites with some regularity. Parent–child and sibling–sibling unions are almost universally taboo.

== Origin ==
Debate about the origin of the incest taboo has often been framed as a question of whether it is based in nature or nurture.

One explanation sees the incest taboo as a cultural implementation of a biologically evolved preference for sexual partners with whom one is unlikely to share genes, since inbreeding may have detrimental outcomes. The most widely held hypothesis proposes that the Westermarck effect discourages adults from engaging in sexual relations with individuals with whom they grew up. The existence of the Westermarck effect has achieved some empirical support.

Another school argues that the incest prohibition is a cultural construct which arises as a side effect of a general human preference for group exogamy, which arises because intermarriage between groups construct valuable alliances that improve the ability for both groups to thrive. According to this view, the incest taboo is not necessarily universal, but is likely to arise and become more strict under cultural circumstances that favour exogamy over endogamy, and likely to become more lax under circumstances that favor endogamy. This hypothesis has also achieved some empirical support.

=== Limits to biological evolution of taboo ===
While it is theoretically possible that natural selection may, under certain genetic circumstances, select for individuals that instinctively avoid mating with (close) relatives, incest will still exist in the gene pool because even genetically weakened, inbred individuals are better watchposts against predators than none at all, and weak individuals are useful for the stronger individuals in the group as looking out for predators without being able to seriously compete with the stronger individuals.

== Research ==
Modern anthropology developed at a time when a great many human societies were illiterate, and much of the research on incest taboos has taken place in societies without legal codes, and, therefore, without written laws concerning marriage and incest. Nevertheless, anthropologists have found that the institution of marriage, and rules concerning appropriate and inappropriate sexual behavior, exist in every society. The following excerpt from Notes and Queries on Anthropology (1951), a well-established field manual for ethnographic research, illustrates the scope of ethnographic investigation into the matter:

Incest is sexual intercourse between individuals related in certain prohibited degrees of kinship. In every society there are rules prohibiting incestuous unions, both as to sexual intercourse and recognized marriage. The two prohibitions do not necessarily coincide. There is no uniformity as to which degrees are involved in the prohibitions. The rules regulating incest must be investigated in every society by means of the genealogical method. The prohibition may be so narrow as to include only one type of parent–child relationship (though this is very rare), or those within the elementary family; or so wide as to include all with whom genealogical or classificatory kinship can be traced. The more usual practice is that unions with certain relatives only are considered incestuous, the relationships being regulated by the type of descent emphasized. In some societies unions with certain persons related by affinity are also considered incestuous. What penalties fall on (a) the individuals concerned; (b) the community as a whole? Are such penalties enforced by authority, or are they believed to ensue automatically by the action of a supernatural force? Is there any correlation between the severity of the penalty and the nearness of the blood-tie of the partners in guilt? Should children be born as the result of incestuous unions, how are they treated? Are there any methods, ritual or legal, by which persons who fall within the prohibited degrees and wish to marry can break the relationship and become free to marry?

These theories anthropologists are generally concerned solely with brother–sister incest, and are not claiming that all sexual relations among family members are taboo or even necessarily considered incestuous by that society. These theories are further complicated by the fact that in many societies people related to one another in different ways, and sometimes distantly, are classified together as siblings, and others who are just as closely related genetically are not considered family members.

The definition restricts itself to sexual intercourse; this does not mean that other forms of sexual contact do not occur, or are proscribed, or prescribed. For example, in some Inuit societies in the Arctic, and traditionally in Bali, mothers would routinely stroke the penises of their infant sons; such behavior was considered no more sexual than breastfeeding.

In these theories, anthropologists are primarily concerned with marriage rules and not actual sexual behavior. In short, anthropologists were not studying "incest" per se; they were asking informants what they meant by "incest", and what the consequences of "incest" were, in order to map out social relationships within the community.

This excerpt also suggests that the relationship between sexual and marriage practices is complex, and that societies distinguish between different sorts of prohibitions. In other words, although an individual may be prohibited from marrying or having sexual relations with many people, different sexual relations may be prohibited for different reasons, and with different penalties.

For example, Trobriand Islanders prohibit both sexual relations between a woman and her brother, and between a woman and her father, but they describe these prohibitions in very different ways: relations between a woman and her brother fall within the category of forbidden relations among members of the same clan; relations between a woman and her father do not. This is because the Trobrianders are matrilineal; children belong to the clan of their mother and not of their father. Thus, sexual relations between a man and his mother's sister (and mother's sister's daughter) are also considered incestuous, but relations between a man and his father's sister are not. A man and his father's sister will often have a flirtatious relationship, and, far from being taboo, Trobriand society encourages a man and his father's sister or the daughter of his father's sister to have sexual relations or marry.

=== Instinctual and genetic explanations ===
An explanation for the taboo is that it is due to an instinctual, inborn aversion that would lower the adverse genetic effects of inbreeding such as a higher incidence of congenital birth defects. Since the rise of modern genetics, belief in this theory has grown.

==== Birth defects and inbreeding ====
The increase in frequency of birth defects often attributed to inbreeding results directly from an increase in the frequency of homozygous alleles inherited by the offspring of inbred couples. This leads to an increase in homozygous allele frequency within a population, and results in diverging effects. Should a child inherit the version of homozygous alleles responsible for a birth defect from its parents, the birth defect will be expressed; on the other hand, should the child inherit the version of homozygous alleles not responsible for a birth defect, it would actually decrease the ratio of the allele version responsible for the birth defect in that population. The overall consequences of these diverging effects depends in part on the size of the population.

In small populations, as long as children born with inheritable birth defects die (or are killed) before they reproduce, the ultimate effect of inbreeding will be to decrease the frequency of defective genes in the population; over time, the gene pool will be healthier. However, in larger populations, it is more likely that large numbers of carriers will survive and mate, leading to more constant rates of birth defects. Besides recessive genes, there are also other reasons why inbreeding may be harmful, such as a narrow range of certain immune systems genes in a population increasing vulnerability to infectious diseases (see Major histocompatibility complex and sexual selection). The biological costs of incest also depend largely on the degree of genetic proximity between the two relatives engaging in incest. This fact may explain why the cultural taboo generally includes prohibitions against sex between close relatives but less often includes prohibitions against sex between more distal relatives. Children born of close relatives have decreased survival. Many mammal species, including humanity's closest primate relatives, avoid incest.

==== Westermarck effect ====
The Westermarck effect, first proposed by Edvard Westermarck in 1891, is the theory that children reared together, regardless of biological relationship, form a sentimental attachment that is by its nature non-erotic. Melford Spiro argued that his observations that unrelated children reared together on Israeli Kibbutzim nevertheless avoided one another as sexual partners confirmed the Westermarck effect. Joseph Shepher in a study examined the second generation in a kibbutz and found no marriages and no sexual activity between the adolescents in the same peer group. This was not enforced but voluntary. Looking at the second generation adults in all kibbutzim, out of a total of 2769 marriages, none were between those of the same peer group.

However, according to a book review by John Hartung of a book by Shepher, out of 2516 marriages documented in Israel, 200 were between couples reared in the same kibbutz. These marriages occurred after young adults reared on kibbutzim had served in the military and encountered tens of thousands of other potential mates, and 200 marriages is higher than what would be expected by chance. Of these 200 marriages, five were between men and women who had been reared together for the first six years of their lives.

A study in Taiwan of marriages where the future bride is adopted in the groom's family as an infant or small child found that these marriages have higher infidelity and divorce and lower fertility than ordinary marriages; it has been argued that this observation is consistent with the Westermarck effect.

==== Third-parties' objections ====
Another approach is looking at moral objections to third-party incest. This increases the longer a child has grown up together with another child of the opposite sex. This occurs even if the other child is genetically unrelated. Humans have been argued to have a special kin detection system that besides the incest taboo also regulates a tendency towards altruism towards kin.

==== Counter arguments ====
One objection against an instinctive and genetic basis for the incest taboo is that incest does occur. Anthropologists have also argued that the social construct "incest" (and the incest taboo) is not the same thing as the biological phenomenon of "inbreeding". For example, there is equal genetic relation between a man and the daughter of his father's sister and between a man and the daughter of his mother's sister, such that biologists would consider mating incestuous in both instances, but Trobrianders consider mating incestuous in one case and not in the other. Anthropologists have documented a great number of societies where marriages between some first cousins are prohibited as incestuous, while marriages between other first cousins are encouraged. Therefore, it is argued that the prohibition against incestuous relations in most societies is not based on or motivated by concerns over biological closeness. Other studies on cousin marriages have found support for a biological basis for the taboo. Also, current supporters of genetic influences on behavior do not argue that genes determine behavior absolutely, but that genes may create predispositions that are affected in various ways by the environment (including culture).

Steve Stewart-Williams argues against the view that incest taboo is a Western phenomenon, arguing that while brother–sister marriage was reported in a diverse range of cultures such Egyptian, Incan, and Hawaiian cultures, it was not a culture-wide phenomenon, being largely restricted to the upper classes. Stewart-Williams argues that these marriages were largely political (their function being to keep power and wealth concentrated in the family) and there is no evidence the siblings were attracted to each other and there is in fact some evidence against it (for example, Cleopatra married two of her brothers but did not have children with them, only having children with unrelated lovers). Stewart-Williams suggests that this was therefore simply a case of social pressure overriding anti-incest instincts. Stewart-Williams also observes that anti-incest behaviour has been observed in other animals and even many plant species (many plants could self-pollinate but have mechanisms that prevent them from doing so).

=== Sociological explanations ===
Psychoanalytic theory—in particular, the claimed existence of an Oedipus complex, which is not an instinctual aversion against incest but an instinctual desire—has influenced many theorists seeking to explain the incest taboo using sociological theories.

==== Exogamy ====
The anthropologist Claude Lévi-Strauss developed a general argument for the universality of the incest taboo in human societies. His argument begins with the claim that the incest taboo is in effect a prohibition against endogamy, and the effect is to encourage exogamy. Through exogamy, otherwise unrelated households or lineages will form relationships through marriage, thus strengthening social solidarity. That is, Lévi-Strauss views marriage as an exchange of women between two social groups. This theory is based in part on Marcel Mauss's theory of The Gift, which (in Lévi-Strauss' words) argued:

that exchange in primitive societies consists not so much in economic transactions as in reciprocal gifts, that these reciprocal gifts have a far more important function than in our own, and that this primitive form of exchange is not merely nor essentially of an economic nature but is what he aptly calls "a total social fact", that is, an event which has a significance that is at once social and religious, magic and economic, utilitarian and sentimental, jural and moral.

It is also based on Lévi-Strauss's analysis of data on different kinship systems and marriage practices documented by anthropologists and historians. Lévi-Strauss called attention specifically to data collected by Margaret Mead during her research among the Arapesh. When she asked if a man ever sleeps with his sister, Arapesh replied: "No we don't sleep with our sisters; we give our sisters to other men, and other men give us their sisters." Mead pressed the question repeatedly, asking what would happen if a brother and sister did have sex with one another. Lévi-Strauss quotes the Arapesh response:

What? You would like to marry your sister? What is the matter with you anyway? Don't you want a brother-in-law? Don't you realize that if you marry another man's sister and another man marries your sister, you will have at least two brothers-in-law, while if you marry your own sister, you will have none? With whom will you hunt, with whom will you garden, whom will you visit?

By applying Mauss's theory to data such as Mead's, Lévi-Strauss proposed what he called alliance theory. He argued that, in "primitive" societies—societies not based on agriculture, class hierarchies, or centralized government—marriage is not fundamentally a relationship between a man and a woman, but a transaction involving a woman that forges a relationship—an alliance—between two men.

Some anthropologists argue that nuclear family incest avoidance can be explained in terms of the ecological, demographic, and economic benefits of exogamy.

While Lévi-Strauss generally discounted the relevance of alliance theory in Africa, a particularly strong concern for incest is a fundamental issue among the age systems of East Africa. Here, the avoidance between men of an age-set and their daughters is altogether more intense than in any other sexual avoidance. Paraphrasing Lévi-Strauss's argument, without this avoidance, the rivalries for power between age-sets, coupled with the close bonds of sharing between age-mates, could lead to a sharing of daughters as spouses. Young men entering the age system would then find a dire shortage of marriageable girls, and extended families would be in danger of dying out. Thus, by parading this avoidance of their daughters, senior men make these girls available for younger age-sets and their marriages form alliances that mitigate the rivalries for power.

==== Endogamy ====
Exogamy between households or descent groups is typically prescribed in classless societies. Societies that are stratified—that is, divided into unequal classes—often prescribe different degrees of endogamy. Endogamy is the opposite of exogamy; it refers to the practice of marriage between members of the same social group. An example is India's caste system, in which unequal castes are endogamous. Inequality between ethnic groups and races also correlates with endogamy.

An extreme example of this principle, and an exception to the incest taboo, is found among members of the ruling class in certain ancient states, such as the Inca, Egypt, China, and Hawaii; brother–sister marriage (usually between half-siblings) was a means of maintaining wealth and political power within one family. Some scholars have argued that in Roman-governed Egypt this practice was also found among commoners, but others have argued that this was in fact not the norm.

== See also ==
- Baldwin effect
- Cinderella effect
- Westermarck effect
- Heterosis
- Homozygosity
- Inbreeding avoidance

== Bibliography ==
- Claude Lévi-Strauss, 1969 The Elementary Structures of Kinship revised edition, translated from the French by James Harle Bell and John Richard von Sturmer. Boston: Beacon Press
- George Homans and David M. Schneider, Marriage, Authority, and Final Causes: A Study of Unilateral Cross-Cousin Marriage
- Rodney Needham, Structure and Sentiment: A Test Case in Social Anthropology
- Arthur P. Wolf and William H. Durham (editors), Inbreeding, Incest, and the Incest Taboo: The State of Knowledge at the Turn of the Century, ISBN 0-8047-5141-2
