= Westermarck effect =

Hypothesis that those who grow up together become desensitized to sexual attraction

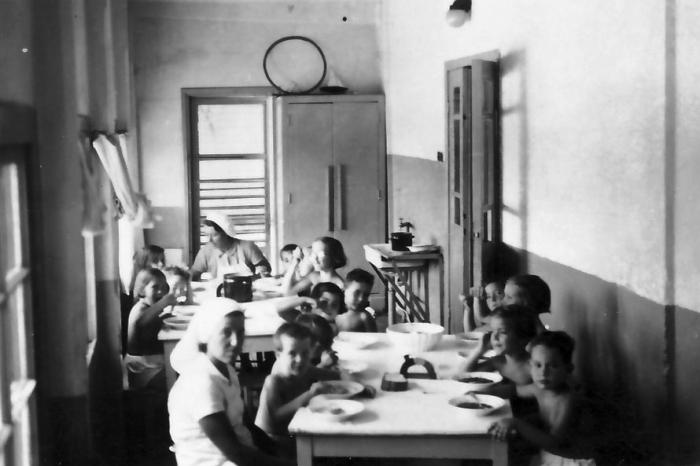
The child-rearing practices of the kibbutz system are sometimes cited as an example of the Westermarck effect. Seen here are a group of children in Kibbutz Gan Shmuel, c. 1935–40.

The Westermarck effect, also known as reverse sexual imprinting, is a psychological hypothesis that states that people tend not to be attracted to peers with whom they lived like siblings before the age of six. This hypothesis was first proposed by Finnish anthropologist Edvard Westermarck in his 1891 book, The History of Human Marriage, as one explanation for the incest taboo.

== Research since Westermarck ==
The Westermarck effect has gained some empirical support. Proponents point to evidence from the Israeli kibbutz system, from Chinese Shim-pua marriage customs, and from closely related families.

In the case of the Israeli kibbutzim (collective farms), children were reared somewhat communally in peer groups, based on age, not biological relations. A study of the marriage patterns of these children later in life revealed that out of the nearly 3,000 marriages that occurred across the kibbutz system, only 14 were between children from the same peer group. Of those 14, none had been reared together during the first six years of life. This result suggests that the Westermarck effect operates from birth to at least the age of six.

In Shim-pua marriages, a girl would be adopted into a family as the future wife of a son, often an infant at that time. These marriages often failed, as would be expected according to the Westermarck hypothesis.

Studies show that cousin marriage in Lebanon has a lower success rate if the cousins were raised in sibling-like conditions, first-cousin unions being more successful in Pakistan if there was a substantial age difference, as well as reduced marital appeal for cousins who grew up sleeping in the same room in Morocco. Evidence also indicates that siblings separated for extended periods of time since childhood were more likely to report having engaged in sexual activity with one another.

Eran Shor and Dalit Simchai revisited the kibbutzim results and found sexual attraction where it had not been acted on. They concluded that any innate aversion needs to be backed up by social pressures and norms.

== See also ==
- Accidental incest
- Genetic sexual attraction
- Kibbutz communal child rearing and collective education
- Psychosexual development
  - Electra complex
  - Oedipus complex
- Totem and Taboo
