= Genetic sexual attraction =

Hypothesis that attraction may be a product of genetic similarities

Genetic sexual attraction is a hypothesis that attraction may be a product of genetic similarities. While there is scientific evidence for the position, some commentators regard the hypothesis as pseudoscience. The term is also used for a phenomenon in which biologically related persons separated at a young age develop intense feelings—including sexual attraction—upon the restoration of contact.

== Background ==
The term was popularized in the United States in the late 1980s by Barbara Gonyo, the founder of Truth Seekers in Adoption, a Chicago-based support group for adoptees and their new-found relatives. Gonyo first heard the term used during an American Adoption Congress conference in the early 1980s. She developed sexual feelings for her son when she met him after he was adopted away, but he did not want to be part of any such contact.

Psychologists theorize that the reported phenomenon of attraction to biological relatives separated at a young age occurs because the separation forecloses the Westermarck effect, which normally desensitizes biologically related persons to later sexual attraction. Another suggested explanation for the phenomenon is possible narcissistic feelings.

Reported frequently in the field of psychology, there are some studies showing that people are sexually attracted to those genetically similar to them. Studies of MHC genes show that people are attracted to those genetically different to them. In mice, this inhibition of attraction between genetically related individuals has been shown to be removed in fostered animals as mice use their close kin, not their own, as a reference of what MHC marker to avoid when mating.

Catherine MacAskill, an adoption and child sexual abuse expert, has suggested that "genetic sexual attraction" cases seem to be associated with sudden unplanned meetings which lack the proper safeguards of a thoroughly prepared reunion.

== Criticism ==
Critics of the hypothesis have called it pseudoscience. In a Salon piece, Amanda Marcotte called the concept "half-baked pseudoscientific nonsense that people dreamed up to justify continuing unhealthy, abusive relationships". The use of "GSA" as an initialism has also been criticized, since it gives the notion that the phenomenon is an actual diagnosable "condition".

Many have noted the lack of research on the subject. While acknowledging the "phenomenon of genetic sexual attraction", Eric Anderson, a sociologist and sexologist, noted in a 2012 book that "[t]here is only one academic research article" on the subject, and he critiqued the paper for using "Freudian psycho-babble".

== See also ==
- Assortative mating, preferential mating between individuals with similar characteristics
