= Nurture kinship =

Acts of nurture between individuals

The concept of nurture kinship in the anthropological study of human social relationships (kinship) highlights the extent to which such relationships are brought into being through the performance of various acts of nurture between individuals. Additionally the concept highlights ethnographic findings that, in a wide swath of human societies, people understand, conceptualize and symbolize their relationships predominantly in terms of giving, receiving and sharing nurture. The concept stands in contrast to the earlier anthropological concepts of human kinship relations being fundamentally based on "blood ties", some other form of shared substance, or a proxy for these (as in fictive kinship), and the accompanying notion that people universally understand their social relationships predominantly in these terms.

The nurture kinship perspective on the ontology of social ties, and how people conceptualize them, has become stronger in the wake of David M. Schneider's influential Critique of the Study of Kinship and Holland's subsequent Social Bonding and Nurture Kinship, demonstrating that as well as the ethnographic record, biological theory and evidence also more strongly support the nurture perspective than the blood perspective (see Human inclusive fitness). Both Schneider and Holland argue that the earlier blood theory of kinship derived from an unwarranted extension of symbols and values from anthropologists' own cultures (see ethnocentrism).

== Intellectual background ==
Reports of kinship ties being based on various forms of shared nurture date back at least to William Robertson Smith's (1889) compiled Lectures on The Religion of the Semites:

According to antique ideas, those who eat and drink together are by this very act tied to one another by a bond of friendship and mutual obligation... The idea that kinship is not purely an affair of birth, but may be acquired, has quite fallen out of our circle of ideas. (Robertson Smith 1889, 265, 273)

At this stage, Robertson Smith interpreted the kinship ties emerging from the sharing of food as constituting an alternative form of the sharing of substance, aside from the sharing of blood or genetic substance which many anthropologists (e.g. Lewis H. Morgan) assumed was the 'natural basis' of social ties. However, later observations focused on the nurturing qualities of food-sharing behavior, allowing a potential distinction between the earlier emphasis on kinship as shared substance (e.g. food or blood) and kinship as performance (of care-giving or nurturing behaviors):

I want to examine the human relationships of a primitive society as determined by nutritional needs, showing how hunger shapes the sentiments which bind together the members of each social group. By what means is this fundamental biological want fulfilled in a given environment; and what forms of human activities and social groupings are so derived? (Richards 1932, 23)

Sometimes the line between conceiving of kinship as substance or as nurture is blurred by using both concepts. For example, the substance of food or milk may be conceived as the medium or vehicle through which the nurturing behavior is performed (e.g. Strathern 1973). The notion that it is the nurturing acts themselves that create social ties between people has developed most noticeably since the 1970s:

The Navajo never mention common substance in finding or invoking kinship ties or norms. Kinship is defined in terms of the acts of giving birth and sharing sustenance. The primary bond in the Navajo kinship system is the mother-child bond, and it is in this bond that the nature and meaning of kinship become clear. In Navajo culture, kinship means intense, diffuse, and enduring solidarity, and this solidarity is realized in actions and behavior befitting the cultural definitions of kinship solidarity. Just as a mother is one who gives life to her children through birth and sustains their life by providing them with loving care, assistance, protection, and sustenance, kinsmen are those who sustain each other's life by helping one another, protecting one another, and by the giving or sharing of food and other items of subsistence. Where this kind of solidarity exists, kinship exists; where it does not, there is no kinship. (Witherspoon 1975, 21–22)

The term "nurture kinship" may have been first used in the present context by Watson (1983), who contrasted it with "nature kinship" (kinship concepts built upon shared substance of some kind). Since the 1970s, an increasing number of ethnographies have documented the extent to which social ties in various cultures can be understood to be built upon nurturant acts.

== Ethnographic examples ==
Marshall on the Trukese (now known as the Chuukese) of Micronesia:

All sibling relationships – natural or created – involve the height of sharing and "feelings of strong sentimental attachment." ... In Trukese kinship, actions speak louder than words; ttong must be demonstrated by nurturant acts. Trukese kinship pivots on the fulcrum of nurturance, a fact partially understood by Ruth Goodenough (1970:331) who noted the "intense concentration on problems of nurture – taking care of and being cared for by others" in GTS. Nurture is the nature of Trukese kinship. (Marshall 1977, 656)

Gow on the Piro of Amazonia:

As a child begins to eat real food, and to walk and eventually to talk, its relationship to its parents changes from one in which the parents take care that their physical connection to the body of the child does not harm it, into one in which gifts of food, given out of love for the child, evoke the child's love for its parents and other kin. Older siblings are very important here. From birth, the baby is frequently picked up and held (marcar, "to hold in the arms") by its older brothers and sisters. As it learns to walk and talk, its closest physical ties are with such siblings, for they are its constant companions and they eat and sleep together. Such intimate ties with siblings replace the earlier one with parents as the child grows. (Gow, 1991, 157)

Thomas on the Temanambondro of Madagascar:

Yet just as fathers are not simply made by birth, neither are mothers, and although mothers are not made by "custom" they, like fathers, can make themselves through another type of performatively constituted relation, the giving of "nurture". Relations of ancestry are particularly important in contexts of ritual, inheritance and the defining of marriageability and incest; they are in effect the "structuring structures" (Bourdieu 1977) of social reproduction and intergenerational continuity. Father, mother and children are, however, also performatively related through the giving and receiving of "nurture" (fitezana). Like ancestry, relations of "nurture" do not always coincide with relations by birth; but unlike ancestry, "nurture" is a largely ungendered relation, constituted in contexts of everyday practical existence, in the intimate, familial and familiar world of the household, and in ongoing relations of work and consumption, of feeding and farming. (Thomas 1999, 37)

Storrie on the Hoti of Venezuelan Guiana:

It was my Hoti friends who, through their rejection of my expectations that I would be able to "collect" genealogical information, brought me to the idea that dwelling together and particularly the notions of consumption and ingestion are, for them, fundamental to social identity. Whenever I attempted to discover if there were ideas of genealogical relatedness between kin, I was told that there is nothing that links a parent to their children, or siblings to each other, apart from the bonds of affection and sentiment that they feel for each other. In other words, there is nothing more to "relatedness" than those things that link "all people" together. (Storrie 2003, 420)

Viegas on a Bahian Amerindian Community in Brazil:

Adults who early in their lives had been taken to become raised children [fostered] state clearly that the situation had never displeased them. They maintain that they belong to the woman who cared for or raised them, and it is to her that they want their children to become attached. Although they recognise who their pais legítimos are, it is those who have cared for a person for a longer period of their childhood that are considered mother and father. It is in this sense that kinship is constituted as memory of being related through caring and feeding, along the lines developed in large part by Peter Gow and within other South Amerindian contexts. (de Matos Viegas 2003, 32)

== Link with attachment theory ==
It can be seen from the ethnographies that several anthropologists have found that describing social ties in terms of emotional attachments is appropriate. This has prompted some to suggest that an inter-disciplinary collaboration might be useful:

Bowlby argued that attachment behaviour in humans and other animals is instinctive, i.e. that evolutionary pressures have selected this psychological trait. ... Now: might Bowlby's realist approach – which defines these behaviours as universal and instinctive, which examines their consequences through naturalistic observation, and which stresses their central role in intensifying human relatedness – be a useful starting point for anthropologists? ... Extrapolating from the work of Myers [on emotions], one could make the case that all anthropological discussions of relatedness – e.g. the accounts by Malinowsky, Mauss, and a great many others of the ways in which gift exchange and reciprocity, or commensality and the sharing of "substance", help to constitute human relatedness – are also by definition, dealing with intractable problems of attachment and separation in social life. (Stafford 2000, 12,24; emphasis in original)

Within the discipline of psychology, the formation of social and emotional ties are treated by attachment theory. Drawing on animal studies from the 1950s onwards, John Bowlby and colleagues described how—for all primates, including humans—the reliable provision of nurture and care leads to strong bonds of attachment between the carer and cared-for.

Attachment theorists now suggest that infants are biologically predisposed to emit signals such as tracking visually, crying, smiling, vocalising, clinging, etc., to elicit nurturance and proximity not only to their mother, but also to their father or any other caregiver (Ainsworth, Bell & Stayton, 1974; Lamb, 1978b). Consistent and prompt responding to infants' signals leads to infants' perception of adults as concerned, predictable, and reliable, and to the formation of secure attachment. Mothers, fathers and other caregivers, by their different styles of responding, create a different set of expectations and an array of attachment relationships of various qualities and flavours (Bretherton, 1985; Bridges, Connell & Belsky, 1988; Stroufe, 1988). (Geiger 1996, 6)

Following the nurture kinship approach thus allows a synthesis between the extensive cross-cultural data of ethnographers and the long-standing findings of psychology on the nature of human bonding and emotional ties.

== Link with evolutionary biology ==
David Schneider suspected that the traditional anthropological models of blood kinship were not mirrored by the "scientific facts of biology".

The last few pages of my book, American Kinship, make the point that the biological elements have a symbolic significance. They constitute an integrated set of symbols in the sense that they are a model for how life, in certain of its aspects, is constituted and should be lived. The symbols are 'biological' in the sense that the culturally given definition of the symbol system is that it is derived from the facts of biology as a process of nature itself. But it is fundamental to our understanding that we appreciate that these biological elements are symbols and that their symbolic referents are not biology as a natural process at all. It is even a moot question as to whether the symbols derive from the facts of nature and the facts of biology as these can be determined scientifically. What is indisputable is that the symbols are formed of elements which in native culture are defined as biological, particularly as aspects of the reproductive process. What is disputable is whether they in fact derive from, or mirror, or are models formed after the scientific facts of biology. I do not think that they are, but this subject is best left to another time. (Schneider 1972, 45, 62)

Holland subsequently showed that Schneider's intuition in regard to the 'scientific facts' was correct. In evolutionary biology, the theory treating the evolution of social cooperation emerged in a formal version in the 1960s and 1970s in the form of inclusive fitness theory, and a related theory, kin selection. The theory specifies that one criterion for the evolution of certain kinds of social traits is a statistical association of identical genes, as would exist when close genetic relatives associate with one another. Early applications of the theory applied to humans (darwinian anthropology) took as their starting position the former anthropological perspective that human kinship is fundamentally "based on" blood-ties. However, these extensions emerged at precisely the time that anthropology was reflexively critiquing this "blood" assumption behind traditional kinship theorizing. This reversion to "blood" led some anthropologists to strongly attack the emerging biological perspectives as suffering the same ethnocentric assumptions (e.g., "blood is thicker than water") that the anthropologists themselves had recently eschewed.

This clash of perspectives led to something of a stand-off and a lack of communication between the disciplines, resulting in little cooperation and progress for three decades. The stand-off was resolved by Holland's Social Bonding and Nurture Kinship which re-visited biological inclusive fitness theory to draw a distinction between the statistical evolutionary mechanisms for the emergence of social traits and the non-deterministic proximate mechanisms through which they are expressed. In a strict interpretation of the theory, a statistical association of related genes (as would be present in the interactions of close genetic relatives) is understood as a necessary (though not sufficient) condition for the evolutionary emergence of certain traits relating to social cooperation (see kin selection). However, this does not entail that the proximate mechanisms governing the expression of such social traits in primates and humans necessarily depends on (or are determined by) conditions of genetic relatedness per se.

For the vast majority of social mammals—including primates and humans—the formation of social bonds (and the resulting social cooperation) are based on familiarity from an early developmental stage, and the same kinds of mechanisms that attachment theorists (see above) have outlined. In short, in humans and in other primates, genetic relatedness is not necessary for the attachment bonds to develop, and it is the performance of nurture that underlies such bonds and the enduring social cooperation that typically accompanies them (see Social Bonding and Nurture Kinship).

Therefore, the nurture kinship perspective leads to the synthesis of evolutionary biology, psychology, and socio-cultural anthropology on the topic of social bonding and cooperation, without reductionism or positing a deterministic role to genes or genetic relatedness in the mechanisms through which social behaviors are expressed.

== Alternative perspectives and critiques ==
According to Hamilton's rule, kin selection causes genes to increase in frequency when the genetic relatedness of a recipient to an actor multiplied by the benefit to the recipient is greater than the reproductive cost to the actor. Hamilton proposed two mechanisms for kin selection. First, kin recognition allows individuals to be able to identify their relatives. Second, in viscous populations, populations in which the movement of organisms from their place of birth is relatively slow, local interactions tend to be among relatives by default. The viscous population mechanism makes kin selection and social cooperation possible in the absence of kin recognition. In this case, nurture kinship, the interaction between related individuals, simply as a result of living in each other's proximity, is sufficient for kin selection, given reasonable assumptions about population dispersal rates. Note that kin selection is not the same thing as group selection, where natural selection is believed to act on the group as a whole.

In humans, altruism is both more likely and on a larger scale with kin than with unrelated individuals; for example, humans give presents according to how closely related they are to the recipient. In other species, vervet monkeys use allomothering, where related females such as older sisters or grandmothers often care for young, according to their relatedness. The social shrimp Synalpheus regalis protects juveniles within highly related colonies.

Therefore, the nurture kinship perspective enables common ground between evolutionary biology, psychology, and socio-cultural anthropology on the topic of social bonding and cooperation, without reductionism or positing a deterministic role to genes or genetic relatedness in the mechanisms through which social behaviors are expressed.

In all of the above examples that are argued to support the 'nurture kinship' perspective, alternative interpretations may be equally persuasive or more insightful. In many such small communities, which may be isolated (such as the ones of the Chuuk of Micronesia), the relatedness between members of a group is to be assumed. This may also be the case for an amerindian tribe (such as the Hoti of Guyana, and the Bahian Amerindians). So it can be argued that those bonds of affection are what naturally link parents to children exactly because of their existing relatedness.

In many of these cases, even if 'symbolic valuation' (and explicit recognition) of blood is not present, most of the time nurturing may anyway be concentrated between (blood) siblings (e.g. the Piro of Amazonia). In the case of the Temanambondro of Madagascar, as in the above case of the Navajo, nurturing is a complementary element of kin-familial and social life and not an antithesis of it. Likewise, in the Bahain Amerindian (Brazil) case of fostering, the recognition of their legitimate parents does not cease to be made, and it is not rejected. Such attachment is only seen, however, in the perspective of the offspring, rather than in that of the progenitors.

These samples show common elements between them but also with cases in other, including Western civilizational (where milk or breastfeeding siblings and exposed children were common for centuries), similar cases where children are not able to be nurtured by their own birth parents but are nurtured by someone else, but they do not say in themselves that parents in general are not attached, in normal conditions, to their offspring, or if that is a common situation.

These ethnographic examples correspond to a small minority of the World's population. In many cultures, people often value and even pay respect to deceased ancestors they never met, as well as a beloved parent they don't know without being his or her fault. Also, feelings towards relatives should be seen as a more personal and individual issue and particular circumstances be hold into account instead of a common whole-group mentality. Situations where the bond between kindred is broken are also the exception rather than the rule.

Overall the 'nurture kinship' perspective does not necessarily mean that human non-blood relationships such as the relationships based on nurturing are more important than the ones based on blood-kinship, since their motivation is also related to one's survival and perpetuation, or that people are necessarily bound to the culture they are inserted in, nor can it be generalized to the point of claiming all individuals always undervalue blood-kinship in the absence of nurturing. In those cases, attachment to others is not a cultural act but an act of survival. Herbert Gintis, in his review of the book Sex at Dawn, critiques the idea that human males were unconcerned with parentage, "which would make us unlike any other species I can think of". Pascal Boyer, in his work "Minds make Societies", presents that anthropologists tell us that biological fathers everywhere have some connection to their children — so it would seem that there are common features to human families after all. Accusations of ethnocentrism become somewhat misplaced when it is realized that most ethnic groups in the world naturally value their offspring.

A study has shown that humans are about as genetically equivalent to their friends as they are their fourth cousins.

== See also ==
- Fictive kinship
- Kin recognition
- Inclusive fitness in humans
- Milk kinship
- Rada (fiqh)
