= Inclusive fitness in humans =

Fitness theory

Inclusive fitness in humans is the application of inclusive fitness theory to human social behaviour, relationships and cooperation.

Inclusive fitness theory (and the related kin selection theory) are general theories in evolutionary biology that propose a method to understand the evolution of social behaviours in organisms. While various ideas related to these theories have been influential in the study of the social behaviour of non-human organisms, their application to human behaviour has been debated.

Inclusive fitness theory is broadly understood to describe a statistical criterion by which social traits can evolve to become widespread in a population of organisms. However, beyond this some scientists have interpreted the theory to make predictions about how the expression of social behavior is mediated in both humans and other animals – typically that genetic relatedness determines the expression of social behaviour. Other biologists and anthropologists maintain that beyond its statistical evolutionary relevance the theory does not necessarily imply that genetic relatedness per se determines the expression of social behavior in organisms. Instead, the expression of social behavior may be mediated by correlated conditions, such as shared location, shared rearing environment, familiarity or other contextual cues which correlate with shared genetic relatedness, thus meeting the statistical evolutionary criteria without being deterministic. While the former position still attracts controversy, the latter position has a better empirical fit with anthropological data about human kinship practices, and is accepted by cultural anthropologists.

== History ==
Applying evolutionary biology perspectives to humans and human society has often resulted in periods of controversy and debate, due to their apparent incompatibility with alternative perspectives about humanity. Examples of early controversies include the reactions to On the Origin of Species, and the Scopes Monkey Trial. Examples of later controversies more directly connected with inclusive fitness theory and its use in sociobiology include physical confrontations at meetings of the Sociobiology Study Group and more often intellectual arguments such as Sahlins' 1976 book The use and abuse of biology, Lewontin et al.'s 1984 Not in Our Genes, and Kitcher's 1985 Vaulting Ambition:Sociobiology and the Quest for Human Nature. Some of these later arguments were produced by other scientists, including biologists and anthropologists, against Wilson's 1975 book Sociobiology: The New Synthesis, which was influenced by (though not necessarily endorsed by) Hamilton's work on inclusive fitness theory.

A key debate in applying inclusive fitness theory to humans has been between biologists and anthropologists around the extent to which human kinship relationships (considered to be a large component of human solidarity and altruistic activity and practice) are necessarily based on or influenced by genetic relationships or blood-ties ('consanguinity'). The position of most social anthropologists is summarized by Sahlins (1976), that for humans "the categories of 'near' and 'distant' [kin] vary independently of consanguinal distance and that these categories organize actual social practice" (p. 112). Biologists wishing to apply the theory to humans directly disagree, arguing that "the categories of 'near' and 'distant' do not 'vary independently of consanguinal distance', not in any society on earth." (Daly et al. 1997, p282).

This disagreement is central because of the way the association between blood ties/genetic relationships and altruism are conceptualized by many biologists. It is frequently understood by biologists that inclusive fitness theory makes predictions about how behaviour is mediated in both humans and other animals. For example, a recent experiment conducted on humans by the evolutionary psychologist Robin Dunbar and colleagues was, as they understood it, designed "to test the prediction that altruistic behaviour is mediated by Hamilton's rule" (inclusive fitness theory) and more specifically that "If participants follow Hamilton's rule, investment (time for which the [altruistic] position was held) should increase with the recipient's relatedness to the participant. In effect, we tested whether investment flows differentially down channels of relatedness." From their results, they concluded that "human altruistic behaviour is mediated by Hamilton's rule ... humans behave in such a way as to maximize inclusive fitness: they are more willing to benefit closer relatives than more distantly related individuals." (Madsen et al. 2007). This position continues to be rejected by social anthropologists as being incompatible with the large amount of ethnographic data on kinship and altruism that their discipline has collected over many decades, that demonstrates that in many human cultures, kinship relationships (accompanied by altruism) do not necessarily map closely onto genetic relationships.

Whilst the above understanding of inclusive fitness theory as necessarily making predictions about how human kinship and altruism is mediated is common amongst evolutionary psychologists, other biologists and anthropologists have argued that it is at best a limited (and at worst a mistaken) understanding of inclusive fitness theory. These scientists argue that the theory is better understood as simply describing an evolutionary criterion for the emergence of altruistic behaviour, which is explicitly statistical in character, not as predictive of proximate or mediating mechanisms of altruistic behaviour, which may not necessarily be determined by genetic relatedness (or blood ties) per se. These alternative non-deterministic and non-reductionist understandings of inclusive fitness theory and human behavior have been argued to be compatible with anthropologists' decades of data on human kinship, and compatible with anthropologists' perspectives on human kinship. This position (e.g. nurture kinship) has been largely accepted by social anthropologists, whilst the former position (still held by evolutionary psychologists, see above) remains rejected by social anthropologists.

== Theoretical background ==
=== Theoretical overview ===
Inclusive fitness theory, first proposed by Bill Hamilton in the early 1960s, proposes a selective criterion for the potential evolution of social traits in organisms, where social behavior that is costly to an individual organism's survival and reproduction could nevertheless emerge under certain conditions. The key condition relates to the statistical likelihood that significant benefits of a social trait or behavior accrue to (the survival and reproduction of) other organisms who also carry the social trait. Inclusive fitness theory is a general treatment of the statistical probabilities of social traits accruing to any other organisms likely to propagate a copy of the same social trait. Kin selection theory treats the narrower but more straightforward case of the benefits accruing to close genetic relatives (or what biologists call 'kin') who may also carry and propagate the trait. Under conditions where the social trait sufficiently correlates (or more properly, regresses) with other likely bearers, a net overall increase in reproduction of the social trait in future generations can result.

The concept serves to explain how natural selection can perpetuate altruism. If there is an "altruism gene" (or complex of genes or heritable factors) that influence an organism's behavior in such a way that is helpful and protective of relatives and their offspring, this behavior can also increase the proportion of the altruism gene in the population, because relatives are likely to share genes with the altruist due to common descent. In formal terms, if such a complex of genes arises, Hamilton's rule (rb>c) specifies the selective criteria (in terms of relatedness (r), cost (c) benefit (b)) for such a trait to increase in frequency in the population (see Inclusive fitness for more details). Hamilton noted that inclusive fitness theory does not by itself predict that a given species will necessarily evolve such altruistic behaviors, since an opportunity or context for interaction between individuals is a more primary and necessary requirement in order for any social interaction to occur in the first place. As Hamilton put it, "Altruistic or selfish acts are only possible when a suitable social object is available. In this sense behaviours are conditional from the start." (Hamilton 1987, 420). In other words, whilst inclusive fitness theory specifies a set of necessary criteria for the evolution of certain altruistic traits, it does not specify a sufficient condition for their evolution in any given species, since the typical ecology, demographics and life pattern of the species must also allow for social interactions between individuals to occur before any potential elaboration of social traits can evolve in regard to those interactions.

=== Initial presentations of the theory ===
The initial presentation of inclusive fitness theory (in the mid-1960s, see The Genetical Evolution of Social Behaviour) focused on making the general mathematical case for the possibility of social evolution. However, since many field biologists mainly use theory as a guide to their observations and analysis of empirical phenomena, Hamilton also speculated about possible proximate behavioural mechanisms that might be observable in organisms whereby a social trait could effectively achieve this necessary statistical correlation between its likely bearers:

The selective advantage which makes behaviour conditional in the right sense on the discrimination of factors which correlate with the relationship of the individual concerned is therefore obvious. It may be, for instance, that in respect of a certain social action performed towards neighbours indiscriminately, an individual is only just breaking even in terms of inclusive fitness. If he could learn to recognise those of his neighbours who really were close relatives and could devote his beneficial actions to them alone an advantage to inclusive fitness would at once appear. Thus a mutation causing such discriminatory behaviour itself benefits inclusive fitness and would be selected. In fact, the individual may not need to perform any discrimination so sophisticated as we suggest here; a difference in the generosity of his behaviour according to whether the situations evoking it were encountered near to, or far from, his own home might occasion an advantage of a similar kind." (Hamilton 1996 [1964], 51)

Hamilton here was suggesting two broad proximate mechanisms by which social traits might meet the criterion of correlation specified by the theory:

Kin recognition (active discrimination): If a social trait enables an organism to distinguish between different degrees of genetic relatedness when interacting in a mixed population, and to discriminate (positively) in performing social behaviours on the basis of detecting genetic relatedness, then the average relatedness of the recipients of altruism could be high enough to meet the criterion. In another section of the same paper (page 54) Hamilton considered whether 'supergenes' that identify copies of themselves in others might evolve to give more accurate information about genetic relatedness. He later (1987, see below) considered this to be wrong-headed and withdrew the suggestion.

Viscous populations (spatial cues): Even indiscriminate altruism may achieve the correlation in 'viscous' populations where individuals have low rates of dispersal or short distances of dispersal from their home range (their location of birth). Here, social partners are typically genealogically closely related, and so altruism can flourish even in the absence of kin recognition and kin discrimination faculties – spatial proximity and circumstantial cues provide the necessary correlation.

These two alternative suggestions had important effects on how field biologists understood the theory and what they looked for in the behavior of organisms. Within a few years biologists were looking for evidence that 'kin recognition' mechanisms might occur in organisms, assuming this was a necessary prediction of inclusive fitness theory, leading to a sub-field of 'kin recognition' research.

=== Later theoretical refinements ===
A common source of confusion around inclusive fitness theory is that Hamilton's early analysis included some inaccuracies, that, although corrected by him in later publications, are often not fully understood by other researchers who attempt to apply inclusive fitness to understanding organisms' behaviour. For example, Hamilton had initially suggested that the statistical correlation in his formulation could be understood by a correlation coefficient of genetic relatedness, but quickly accepted George Price's correction that a general regression coefficient was the more relevant metric, and together they published corrections in 1970. A related confusion is the connection between inclusive fitness and multi-level selection, which are often incorrectly assumed to be mutually exclusive theories. The regression coefficient helps to clarify this connection:

Because of the way it was first explained, the approach using inclusive fitness has often been identified with 'kin selection' and presented strictly as an alternative to 'group selection'. But the foregoing discussion shows that kinship should be considered just one way of getting positive regression of genotype in the recipient, and that it is this positive regression that is vitally necessary for altruism. Thus the inclusive-fitness concept is more general than 'kin selection'.(Hamilton 1996 [1975], 337)

Hamilton also later modified his thinking about likely mediating mechanisms whereby social traits achieve the necessary correlation with genetic relatedness. Specifically he corrected his earlier speculations that an innate ability (and 'supergenes') to recognise actual genetic relatedness was a likely mediating mechanism for kin altruism:

But once again, we do not expect anything describable as an innate kin recognition adaptation, used for social behaviour other than mating, for the reasons already given in the hypothetical case of the trees. (Hamilton 1987, 425)

The point about inbreeding avoidance is significant, since the whole genome of sexual organisms benefits from avoiding close inbreeding; there is a different selection pressure at play compared to the selection pressure on social traits (see Kin recognition for more information).

It does not follow… that ability to discriminate degrees of relatedness automatically implies that kin selection is the model relevant to its origin. In fact, since even earlier than Darwin, it had been realised that most organisms tend to avoid closely inbred matings. The reasons must have to do with the function of sexuality and this is not quite yet resolved (see e.g. Bell, 1982; Shields, 1982; Hamilton, 1982); but whatever the function is, here must be another set of reasons for discriminating. Some animals clearly do use discrimination for purposes of mate selection. Japanese quail for example evidently use an early imprinting of their chick companions towards obtaining, much later, preferred degrees of consanguinity in their mates (Bateson 1983). (Hamilton 1987, 419)

Since Hamiton's 1964 speculations about active discrimination mechanisms (above), other theorists such as Richard Dawkins had clarified that there would be negative selection pressure against mechanisms for genes to recognize copies of themselves in other individuals and discriminate socially between them on this basis. Dawkins used his 'Green beard' thought experiment, where a gene for social behaviour is imagined also to cause a distinctive phenotype that can be recognised by other carriers of the gene. Due to conflicting genetic similarity in the rest of the genome, there would be selection pressure for green-beard altruistic sacrifices to be suppressed via meitoic drive.

=== Ongoing misconceptions ===
Hamilton's later clarifications often go unnoticed, and because of the long-standing assumption that kin selection requires innate powers of kin recognition, some theorists have later tried to clarify the position:

[T]he fact that animals benefit from engaging in spatially mediated behaviors is not evidence that these animals can recognize their kin, nor does it support the conclusion that spatially based differential behaviors represent a kin recognition mechanism (see also discussions by Blaustein, 1983; Waldman, 1987; Halpin 1991). In other words, from an evolutionary perspective it may well be advantageous for kin to aggregate and for individuals to behave preferentially towards nearby kin, whether or not this behaviour is the result of kin recognition per se" (Tang-Martinez 2001, 25)

In his original papers on inclusive fitness theory, Hamilton pointed out a sufficiently high relatedness to favour altruistic behaviours could accrue in two ways – kin discrimination or limited dispersal (Hamilton, 1964, 1971,1972, 1975). There is a huge theoretical literature on the possible role of limited dispersal reviewed by Platt & Bever (2009) and West et al. (2002a), as well as experimental evolution tests of these models (Diggle et al., 2007; Griffin et al., 2004; Kümmerli et al., 2009). However, despite this, it is still sometimes claimed that kin selection requires kin discrimination (Oates & Wilson, 2001; Silk, 2002 ). Furthermore, a large number of authors appear to have implicitly or explicitly assumed that kin discrimination is the only mechanism by which altruistic behaviours can be directed towards relatives... [T]here is a huge industry of papers reinventing limited dispersal as an explanation for cooperation. The mistakes in these areas seem to stem from the incorrect assumption that kin selection or indirect fitness benefits require kin discrimination (misconception 5), despite the fact that Hamilton pointed out the potential role of limited dispersal in his earliest papers on inclusive fitness theory (Hamilton, 1964; Hamilton, 1971; Hamilton, 1972; Hamilton, 1975). (West et al. 2010, p.243 and supplement)

The assumption that 'kin selection requires kin discrimination' has obscured the more parsimonious possibility that spatial-cue-based mediation of social cooperation based on limited dispersal and shared developmental context are commonly found in many organisms that have been studied, including in social mammal species. As Hamilton pointed out, "Altruistic or selfish acts are only possible when a suitable social object is available. In this sense behaviours are conditional from the start" (Hamilton 1987, see above section). Since a reliable context of interaction between social actors is always a necessary condition for social traits to emerge, a reliable context of interaction is necessarily present to be leveraged by context-dependent cues to mediate social behaviours. Focus on mediating mechanisms of limited dispersal and reliable developmental context has allowed significant progress in applying kin selection and inclusive fitness theory to a wide variety of species, including humans, on the basis of cue-based mediation of social bonding and social behaviours (see below).

== Mammal evidence ==
In mammals, as well as in other species, ecological niche and demographic conditions strongly shape typical contexts of interaction between individuals, including the frequency and circumstances surrounding the interactions between genetic relatives. Although mammals exist in a wide variety of ecological conditions and varying demographic arrangements, certain contexts of interaction between genetic relatives are nevertheless reliable enough for selection to act upon. New born mammals are often immobile and always totally dependent (socially dependent if you will) on their carer(s) for nursing with nutrient rich milk and for protection. This fundamental social dependence is a fact of life for all mammals, including humans. These conditions lead to a reliable spatial context in which there is a statistical association of replica genes between a reproductive female and her infant offspring (and has been evolutionary typical) for most mammal species. Beyond this natal context, extended possibilities for frequent interaction between related individuals are more variable and depend on group living vs. solitary living, mating patterns, duration of pre-maturity development, dispersal patterns, and more. For example, in group living primates with females remaining in their natal group for their entire lives, there will be lifelong opportunities for interactions between female individuals related through their mothers and grandmothers etc. These conditions also thus provide a spatial-context for cue-based mechanisms to mediate social behaviours.

The most widespread and important mechanism for kin recognition in mammals appears to be familiarity through prior association (Bekoff, 1981; Sherman, 1980). During development, individuals learn and respond to cues from the most familiar or most commonly encountered conspecifics in their environment. Individuals respond to familiar individuals as kin and unfamiliar individuals as nonkin. (Erhart et al. 1997, 153–154)

Mammalian young are born into a wide variety of social situations, ranging from being isolated from all other individuals except their mother (and possibly other siblings) to being born into large social groups. Although siblings do interact in a wide variety of species having different life histories, there are certain conditions, almost all of which have to do with the developmental environment, that will favor a biased occurrence of interactions between littermates and/or different-aged siblings. It will be argued later that it is these, and perhaps other, conditions that predispose (in a probabilistic way) siblings to interact with one another. However, if two (or more) very young unrelated individuals (assume conspecifics for simplicity) are exposed to these conditions, they too will behave like siblings. That is, although [relatedness] and [familiarity] are tightly linked in many mammals, it is [familiarity] that can override [relatedness], rather than the reverse. (Bekoff 1981, 309)

In addition to the above examples, a wide variety of evidence from mammal species supports the finding that shared context and familiarity mediate social bonding, rather than genetic relatedness per se. Cross-fostering studies (placing unrelated young in a shared developmental environment) strongly demonstrate that unrelated individuals bond and cooperate just as would normal littermates. The evidence therefore demonstrates that bonding and cooperation are mediated by proximity, shared context and familiarity, not via active recognition of genetic relatedness. This is problematic for those biologists who wish to claim that inclusive fitness theory predicts that social cooperation is mediated via genetic relatedness, rather than understanding the theory simply to state that social traits can evolve under conditions where there is statistical association of genetically related organisms. The former position sees the expression of cooperative behaviour as more or less deterministically caused by genetic relatedness, where the latter position does not. The distinction between cooperation mediated by shared context, and cooperation mediated by genetic relatedness per se, has significant implications for whether inclusive fitness theory can be seen as compatible with the anthropological evidence on human social patterns or not. The shared context perspective is largely compatible, the genetic relatedness perspective is not (see below).

== Human kinship and cooperation ==
The debate about how to interpret the implications of Inclusive fitness theory for human social cooperation has paralleled some of the key misunderstandings outlined above. Initially, evolutionary biologists interested in humans wrongly assumed that in the human case, 'kin selection requires kin discrimination' along with their colleagues studying other species (see West et al., above). In other words, many biologists assumed that strong social bonds accompanied by altruism and cooperation in human societies (long studied by the anthropological field of kinship) were necessarily built upon recognizing genetic relatedness (or 'blood ties'). This seemed to fit well with historical research in anthropology originating in the nineteenth century (see history of kinship) that often assumed that human kinship was built upon a recognition of shared blood ties.

However, independently of the emergence of inclusive fitness theory, from 1960s onwards many anthropologists themselves had reexamined the balance of findings in their own ethnographic data and had begun to reject the notion that human kinship is 'caused by' blood ties (see Kinship). Anthropologists have gathered very extensive ethnographic data on human social patterns and behaviour over a century or more, from a wide spectrum of different cultural groups. The data demonstrates that many cultures do not consider 'blood ties' (in the genealogical sense) to underlie their close social relationships and kinship bonds. Instead social bonds are often considered to be based on location-based shared circumstances including living together (co-residence), sleeping close together, working together, sharing food (commensality) and other forms of shared life together. Comparative anthropologists have shown that these aspects of shared circumstances are a significant component of what influences kinship in most human cultures, notwithstanding whether or not 'blood ties' are necessarily present (see Nurture kinship, below).

Although blood ties (and genetic relatedness) often correlate with kinship, just as in the case of mammals (above section), evidence from human societies suggests that it is not the genetic relatedness per se that is the mediating mechanism of social bonding and cooperation, instead it is the shared context (albeit typically consisting of genetic relatives) and the familiarity that arises from it, that mediate the social bonds. This implies that genetic relatedness is not the determining mechanism nor required for the formation of social bonds in kinship groups, or for the expression of altruism in humans, even if statistical correlations of genetic relatedness are an evolutionary criterion for the emergence of such social traits in biological organisms over evolutionary timescales. Understanding this distinction between the statistical role of genetic relatedness in the evolution of social traits and yet its lack of necessary determining role in mediating mechanisms of social bonding and the expression of altruism is key to inclusive fitness theory's proper application to human social behaviour (as well as to other mammals).

=== Nurture kinship ===
Compatible with biologists' emphasis on familiarity and shared context mediating social bonds, the concept of nurture kinship in the anthropological study of human social relationships highlights the extent to which such relationships are brought into being through the performance of various acts of sharing, acts of care, and performance of nurture between individuals who live in close proximity. Additionally the concept highlights ethnographic findings that, in a wide swath of human societies, people understand, conceptualize and symbolize their relationships predominantly in terms of giving, receiving and sharing nurture. The concept stands in contrast to the earlier anthropological concepts of human kinship relations being fundamentally based on "blood ties", some other form of shared substance, or a proxy for these (as in fictive kinship), and the accompanying notion that people universally understand their social relationships predominantly in these terms.

The nurture kinship perspective on the ontology of social ties, and how people conceptualize them, has become stronger in the wake of David M. Schneider's influential Critique of the Study of Kinship^{[1]} and Holland's subsequent Social Bonding and Nurture Kinship: Compatibility between Cultural and Biological approaches, demonstrating that as well as the ethnographic record, biological theory and evidence also more strongly support the nurture perspective than the blood perspective. Both Schneider and Holland argue that the earlier blood theory of kinship derived from an unwarranted extension of symbols and values from anthropologists' own cultures (see ethnocentrism).
