= Fictive kinship =

Anthropological concept

Fictive kinship (less often, fictional kinship) is a term used by anthropologists and ethnographers to describe forms of kinship or social ties that are based on neither consanguineal (blood ties) nor affinal ("by marriage"), nor nursery (milk) ties. It contrasts with true kinship ties.

To the extent that consanguineal and affinal kinship ties might be considered real or true kinship, the term fictive kinship has in the past been used to refer to those kinship ties that are fictional, in the sense of not-real. Invoking the concept as a cross-culturally valid anthropological category therefore rests on the presumption that the inverse category of "(true) kinship" built around consanguinity and affinity is similarly cross-culturally valid. Use of the term was common until the mid-to-late twentieth century, when anthropology effectively deconstructed and revised many of the concepts and categories around the study of kinship and social ties. In particular, anthropologists established that a consanguinity basis for kinship ties is not universal across cultures, and that—on the contrary—it may be a culturally specific symbol of kinship only in particular cultures (see the articles on kinship and David M. Schneider for more information on the history of kinship studies).

Stemming from anthropology's early connections to legal studies, the term fictive kinship may also be used in a legal sense, and this use continues in societies where these categories and definitions regarding kinship and social ties have legal currency; e.g. in matters of inheritance.

As part of the deconstruction of kinship mentioned above, anthropologists now recognize that—cross-culturally—the kinds of social ties and relationships formerly treated under the category of "kinship" are often not predicated on blood ties or marriage ties, and may rather be based on shared residence, shared economic ties, nurture kinship, or familiarity via other forms of interaction.

In sociology of the family, this idea is referred to as chosen kin, fictive kin or voluntary kin. Sociologists define the concept as a form of extended family members who are not related by either blood or marriage. The bonds allowing for chosen kinship may include religious rituals, close friendship ties, or other essential reciprocal social or economic relationships. Examples of chosen kin include godparents, adopted children, and close family friends. The idea of fictive kin has been used to analyze aging, foreign fighters, immigrant communities, and minorities in modern societies. Some researchers state that peers have the potential to create fictive kin networks.

== Examples ==
Types of relations often described by anthropologists as fictive kinship include compadrazgo relations, foster care, common membership in a unilineal descent group, and legal adoption. A noted Gurung tradition is the institution of "Rodi", where teenagers form fictive kinship bonds and become Rodi members to socialize, perform communal tasks, and find marriage partners. In Western culture, a person may refer to close friends of one's parents as "aunt" or "uncle" (and their children as "cousin"), or may refer to close friends as "brother" or "sister", although this is just a mere courtesy treatment and does not represent an actual valuation as such. In particular, college fraternities and sororities in some North American cultures usually use "brother" and "sister" to refer to members of the organization. Monastic, Masonic, and Lodge organisations also use the term "Brother" for members. "Nursing Sister" is used to denote a rank of nurse, and the term "Sisterhood" may be used for feminists. Fictive kinship was discussed by Jenny White in her work on female migrant workers in Istanbul. In her work, she draws on ideas of production and the women she works with being drawn together through "webs of indebtedness" through which the women refer to each other as kin. These relationships are, however, less frequent than kin relationships, and serve purposes that are neither comparable to nor exclude a natural family.

- Compadrazgo is a form of fictive kinship that is rooted in Central Mexico history for many years. Literally meaning "co-parenthood", compadrazgo is a term to describe the set of relationships between a child, their parents, and their godparents. It has been hypothesized that these relationships evolved after the Spanish conquest in 1521 to help deal with stressful situations. These fictive kinships still exist in modern day Mexican societies, and are established by providing some form of aid throughout the child's life. Godparents seldom become more important than parents, though, much less in a non-economic fashion.
- The boys and men of many societies have customs of "blood brotherhood" in which two unrelated people are declared to be as brothers. Perhaps the best-known such relationship in English-language literature is between the characters Tom Sawyer and Huckleberry Finn in the 1876 novel The Adventures of Tom Sawyer by American author Mark Twain, in a written agreement ritually signed in the parties' blood and deemed to have supernatural consequences. Mongolian Khagan-Emperor Genghis was anda to fellow aristocrat and political rival Jamukha, though the rivalry would end in the latter's execution. Some sinologists consider the mortal Oath of the Peach Garden in the Romance of the Three Kingdoms, one of the Four Classic Chinese Novels, to be an example of blood brotherhood, although from a Chinese perspective it is sui generis.
- Undocumented immigrants have also demonstrated fictive kin relationships. Undocumented restaurant workers are known to form pseudo-families in which they cooperate within living and working situations. These relationships benefit the workers by creating a support system that would otherwise be unavailable to those living far from home. These ties are, however, fictive in a strict sense and mean nothing to the people in such pretenses.
- Some fictive kin relationships have been discovered in Israel in relation to organ transplants. Hospital committees are formed to assess whether the organ donation is from a true family member or from a friend. In order to obtain organ transplants, some individuals are forced to find strangers and pay them compensation for the procedure. However, the relationship between the donor and recipient must be invented as a familial relationship in order to pass through the hospital committee. In this case, fictive kinship is created knowingly to both parties in order to achieve their goals, and is mutualistic in nature.
- Adoption and foster care have always been grouped into the fictive kinship category (in cases where the child shares no genetic relatedness to the caregivers). The children are normally treated as the adopters' biological kin, receiving a lot of parental investment despite not having family ties. This view has been chastised by some who claim that notions of kinship are not always based on biological determinants.
- The United States military has also been an avenue to propagate fictive kinship, such as the sense of brotherhood felt by the soldiers. Fictive kinship has been demonstrated among the spouses of military men and women as well. These relationships may facilitate close bonds that are beneficial during times of hardship.
- Other times, relationships can appear from the outside to be fictive kinship relationships, but the reality is that this appearance is just the result of kinship terminology. Members of the Shanti Nagar village in North India refer to everyone—even strangers—in familial terms. A man would address another man of a similar in age as "brother", and would address an older man as "uncle". Although these terms used in addressing one another appear to be indicative of fictive kinship, they do not actually suggest the existence of ritual kin relationships.

== Critiques ==
Recently, many anthropologists have abandoned a distinction between "real" and "fictive" kin, because many cultures do not base their notion of kinship on genealogical relations. This was argued most forcefully by David M. Schneider, in his 1984 book A critique of the study of kinship. In response to this insight, Janet Carsten developed the idea of "relatedness". She developed her initial ideas from studies with the Malays in looking at what was socialized and biological. Here she uses the idea of relatedness to move away from a pre-constructed analytics opposition which exists in anthropological thought between the biological and the social. Carsten argued that relatedness should be described in terms of indigenous statements and practices, some of which fall outside what anthropologists have conventionally understood as kinship.

This does not imply, however, that human non-kin relationships, such as in tit-for-tat situations, even within a friendship relation, are more important than kin relationships, since their motivation is also related to one's survival and perpetuation, or that people are necessarily bound to the culture they are inserted in, nor can it be generalized to the point of claiming all individuals always undervalue kinship in the absence of nurturing. In those cases, attachment to others is not a cultural act but an act of survival. Herbert Gintis, in his review of the book Sex at Dawn, critiques the idea that human males were unconcerned with parentage, "which would make us unlike any other species I can think of". Such individuals can be considered out of the natural tendency of living beings for survival through offspring.

In response to a similar model advanced by E. O. Wilson, Rice University's David Queller said that such new model "involves, and I suspect requires, close kinship". The theory also overlooks phenomena of survivalist non-kin or not close kin such as the one that can be seen on tribalism or ethnic nationalism.

According to Sarah Hrdy, cooperative breeding occurs among the kin of either parent or other group members.

A study has shown that humans are about as genetically equivalent to their friends as they are their fourth cousins.

== Use in sociobiology ==
In the biological and animal behavioural sciences, the term "kinship" has a different meaning from the current anthropological usage of the term, and more in common with the former anthropological usage that assumed that blood ties are ontologically prior to social ties. In these sciences, "kinship" is commonly used as a shorthand for "the regression coefficient of (genetic) relatedness", which is a metric denoting the proportion of shared genetic material between any two individuals relative to average degrees of genetic variance in the population under study. This coefficient of relationship is an important component of the theory of inclusive fitness, a treatment of the evolutionary selective pressures on the emergence of certain forms of social behavior. Confusingly, inclusive fitness theory is more popularly known through its narrower form, kin selection theory, whose name clearly resonates with former conceptions of "kinship" in anthropology.

Whilst inclusive fitness theory thus describes one of the necessary conditions for the evolutionary emergence of social behaviors, the details of the proximate conditions mediating the expression of social bonding and cooperation have been less investigated in sociobiology. In particular, the question of whether genetic relatedness (or "blood ties") must necessarily be present for social bonding and cooperation to be expressed has been the source of much confusion, partly due to thought experiments in W. D. Hamilton's early theoretical treatments. In addition to setting out the details of the evolutionary selection pressure, Hamilton roughly outlined two possible mechanisms by which the expression of social behaviors might be mediated:

The selective advantage which makes behaviour conditional in the right sense on the discrimination of factors which correlate with the relationship of the individual concerned is therefore obvious. It may be, for instance, that in respect of a certain social action performed towards neighbours indiscriminately, an individual is only just breaking even in terms of inclusive fitness. If he could learn to recognise those of his neighbours who really were close relatives and could devote his beneficial actions to them alone an advantage to inclusive fitness would at once appear. Thus a mutation causing such discriminatory behaviour itself benefits inclusive fitness and would be selected. In fact, the individual may not need to perform any discrimination so sophisticated as we suggest here; a difference in the generosity of his behaviour according to whether the situations evoking it were encountered near to, or far from, his own home might occasion an advantage of a similar kind.

Traditional sociobiology did not consider the divergent consequences between these basic possibilities for the expression of social behavior, and instead assumed that the expression operates in the "recognition" manner, whereby individuals are behaviorally primed to discriminate which others are their true genetic relatives, and engage in cooperative behavior with them. But when expression has evolved to be primarily location-based or context-based—depending on a society's particular demographics and history—social ties and cooperation may or may not coincide with blood ties. Reviews of the mammal, primate, and human evidence demonstrate that expression of social behaviors in these species are primarily location-based and context-based (see nurture kinship), and examples of what used to be labeled as "fictive kinship" are readily understood in this perspective. Social cooperation, however, does not mean people see each other as family or family-like, nor that people will value those known not to be related with them more than the ones who are or simply neglect relatedness.

== See also ==
- Adelphopoiesis
- Blood brother
- Body of Christ
- Brother-in-arms
- Charge nurse
- Compadre
- Filiation
- Fraternity
- Godparent
- Inclusive fitness in humans
- Kin recognition
- Kin selection
- Kinship terminology
- Law of adoption (Mormonism)
- Milk kinship
- Nurture kinship
- Social Bonding and Nurture Kinship

== Bibliography ==
- Carsten, Janet, ed. (2000). Cultures of Relatedness: New Approaches to the Study of Kinship. Cambridge: Cambridge University Press. ISBN 0-521-65627-3.
- Carsten, Janet (May 1995). "The Substance of Kinship and the Heat of the Hearth: Feeding, Personhood, and Relatedness among Malays in Pulau Langkawi". American Ethnologist. 22 (2): 223–241. doi:10.1525/ae.1995.22.2.02a00010. JSTOR 646700.
- Schneider, David M. (1984). A Critique of the Study of Kinship. Ann Arbor, Michigan: University of Michigan Press. ISBN 978-0-472-08051-9. OCLC 10605668.
- White, Jenny B. (2004). Money Makes Us Relatives: Women's Labor in Urban Turkey (2nd ed.). New York: Routledge. ISBN 0-203-24042-1.
