= Social Bonding and Nurture Kinship =

2012 book by Maximilian Holland

Social Bonding and Nurture Kinship: Compatibility between Cultural and Biological Approaches
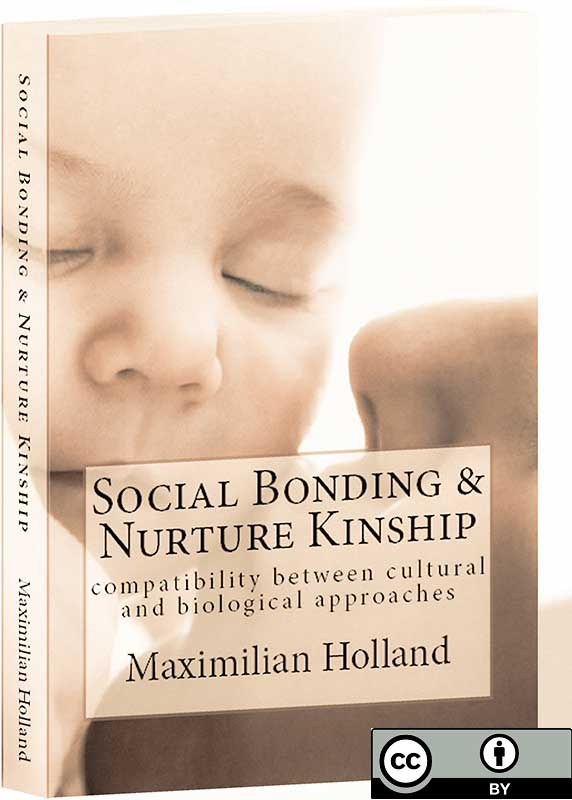
- Cover showing an abstract human care-giving relationship
- Author: Maximilian Holland
- Language: English
- Subjects: Evolutionary biology, sociocultural anthropology, psychology
- Publisher: Createspace Independent Publishing Platform
- Publication date: 2012
- Media type: Print (Paperback)
- Pages: 352
- ISBN: 978-1480182004
- OCLC: 885025426

Social Bonding and Nurture Kinship: Compatibility between Cultural and Biological Approaches is a book on human kinship and social behavior by Maximilian Holland, published in 2012. The work synthesizes the perspectives of evolutionary biology, psychology and sociocultural anthropology towards understanding human social bonding and cooperative behavior. It presents a theoretical treatment that many consider to have resolved longstanding questions about the proper place of genetic (or 'blood') connections in human kinship and social relations, and a synthesis that "should inspire more nuanced ventures in applying Darwinian approaches to sociocultural anthropology".

The aim of the book is to show that "properly interpreted, cultural anthropology approaches (and ethnographic data) and biological approaches are perfectly compatible regarding processes of social bonding in humans." Holland's position is based on demonstrating that the dominant biological theory of social behavior (inclusive fitness theory) is typically misunderstood to predict that genetic ties are necessary for the expression of social behaviors, whereas in fact the theory only implicates genetic associations as necessary for the evolution of social behaviors. Whilst rigorous evolutionary biologists have long understood the distinction between these levels of analysis (see Tinbergen's four questions), past attempts to apply inclusive fitness theory to humans have often overlooked the distinction between evolution and expression.

Beyond its central argument, the broader philosophical implications of Holland's work are considered by commentators to be that it both "helps to untangle a long-standing disciplinary muddle" and "clarifies the relationship between biological and sociocultural approaches to human kinship." It is claimed that the book "demonstrates that an alternative non-deterministic interpretation of evolutionary biology is more compatible with actual human social behavior and with the frameworks that sociocultural anthropology employs" and as a consequence, delivers "a convincing, solid and informed blow to the residual genetic determinism that still influences the interpretation of social behaviour."

== Synopsis ==
The book's form consists of a cumulative argument (using a wide range of supporting evidence) made over nine chapters, with each chapter ending in a brief retrospective summary, and the final chapter containing a recapitulation and summary of the whole, and drawing some wider conclusions.

=== Continuing debate over 'blood kinship' ===
Holland begins by tracing transitions in the history of anthropological theories of social behavior and kinship, noting the varying importance with which 'blood ties' have been understood to be a necessary element of human kinship and social relations. He suggests that whilst the mounting ethnographic evidence has led to a move away from the 'blood kinship' concept in recent decades, many sociocultural anthropologists still query the connection between kinship and blood, reproduction or some other apparently biological functions. Meanwhile, many biologists, biological anthropologists and evolutionary psychologists have persisted in viewing human kinship and cooperative behavior as necessarily associated with genetic relationships and 'blood ties'. The current situation has been characterized as "a clash between incommensurate paradigms, holding as they may, completely incompatible ideas about human nature." Holland argues that a clear resolution to these questions is still outstanding, and would therefore be of value. In closing the introduction, Holland writes; "The approach is not reductive. The claim is rather that a thorough investigation of the 'biological facts' can be useful mainly though allowing a change in focus... away from confusion about the place of genealogy in social ties, and onto a reformulated baseline, built around varied processual aspects of social bonding."

=== Evolutionary biology theory of social behavior ===
The book reviews the background and key elements of Hamilton's inclusive fitness theory from the 1960s onwards, setting out its significant conceptual and heuristic value. Holland notes that Hamilton acknowledged that his earliest and most widely known account (1964) contained technical inaccuracies. He also notes Hamilton's early speculations about possible proximate mechanisms of the expression of social behavior (supergenes as a possible alternative to behaviour-evoking-situations) contained errors that have nevertheless remained very influential in popular accounts. Specifically, the supergenes notion (sometimes called the Green-beard effect) - that organisms may evolve genes that are able to identify identical copies in others and preferentially direct social behaviours towards them - was theoretically clarified and withdrawn by Hamilton in 1987. However, in the intervening years, the notion that supergenes (or more often, simply individual organisms) have evolved to identify genetic relatives and preferentially cooperate with them took hold, and became the way many biologists came to understand the theory. This persisted, despite Hamilton's 1987 correction. In Holland's view it is the pervasiveness of this longstanding but erroneous perspective, and the suppression of the alternative 'behaviour-evoking-situations' perspective regarding social expression mechanisms, that is largely responsible for the ongoing clash between biological and sociocultural approaches to human kinship.

=== Sociobiology and kinship ===
Holland shows that, in the 1970s and 80s, the first wave of attempts (known as human sociobiology or Darwinian anthropology) to apply inclusive fitness theory to human social behavior relied on, and further reinforced, this same misinterpretation (above section) about the theory's predictions and the proximate mechanisms of social behavior. Holland also shows that this period of research was burdened with many misplaced assumptions about universal attributes of the human sexes, sexuality and gender roles, apparently projected from the specific cultural values of the researchers themselves. Holland also shows that, following the perceived failures of this early wave, and particularly its methodological agnosticism regarding proximate mechanisms of social behavior, the evolutionary psychology school grew up in its place. Although this latter school typically avoided engaging with the ethnographic data on human kinship, Holland argues that in the few cases where it did so, it repeated the misinterpretation of inclusive fitness theory that characterized the first wave. Holland also notes that Philip Kitcher, in his 1985 critique of the sociobiological position, suggested that perhaps the expression of social behaviors in humans might quite simply be based on cues of context and familiarity, rather than genetic relatedness per se.

=== Proximate mechanisms and 'kin recognition' ===
Chapters four and five investigate further the theory and evidence surrounding the proximate mechanisms of social behavior; specifically the question of whether social behaviors are expressed by organisms via behaviour-evoking-situations or via direct detection of actual genetic relatedness. Related questions have been the domain of kin recognition theory. Holland notes that the name 'kin recognition' itself suggests some expectation that a positive identification of genetic relatedness is a prediction of inclusive fitness theory, and is thus expected. Similar points have been made by others; "many behavioural ecologists seem to implicitly assume that specialised mechanisms allowing individuals to distinguish their kin from non-kin must have evolved." Again, the possibility that behaviour-evoking-situations might be the more parsimonious mechanism of the expression of social behavior, and fully compatible with inclusive fitness theory, has often been underemphasized. However, Holland's review of the evidence notes that field studies in this area quickly established that behaviour-evoking-situations do in fact overwhelmingly mediate social behaviours in those species studied, and that, particularly in mammal species, social bonding and familiarity formed in early developmental contexts (e.g. in burrows or nesting sites) are a common mediating mechanism for social behaviors, independently of genetic relatedness per se. On the basis of the preceding theoretical analysis and review of evidence, at the end of chapter five, Holland argues that;

It is entirely erroneous, both in reference to theory and in reference to the evidence, to claim or suggest that 'the facts of biology' support the claim that organisms have evolved to cooperate with genetic relatives per se.

=== Primate social bonding and attachment theory ===
Having argued for the above position on the lack of necessity for genetic relatedness per se to mediate social bonding and behavior, Holland suggests that "The further question then is; can we uncover in any greater detail how familiarity and other context-dependent cues operate?". To discover the extent to which the variety of human kinship behaviors may nevertheless be compatible with this (less deterministic) interpretation of biological theory of social behavior, Holland suggests that a survey of primates' most fundamental social patterns may give clues, especially those of species most closely connected with humans. The variety of primate mating systems, group-membership ('philopatry') patterns, and life-cycle patterns are reviewed. Holland finds that;

Like other mammals, Catarrhini primate demographics are strongly influenced by ecological conditions, particularly density and distribution of food sources... Cohesive social groups and delayed natal dispersal mean that maternally related individuals, including maternal siblings, face a statistically reliable context of interaction in all Catarrhini primates. This reliable context of interaction with maternally related individuals is extended amongst those species with female philopatry (especially Cercopithecinae).

As with other social mammals, evidence suggest that the reliability of 'behaviour-evoking-situations' this social context provides has shaped the mechanisms of proximate expression of social bonding and behavior;

Adoption of infants by females (and sometimes males) demonstrates that care-giving and bonding to infants is not mediated by positive powers of discrimination. From the infant's perspective, it will bond with any responsive carer. If not necessarily the actual mother, in natural conditions this will often be a maternal relative (particularly an older sibling), but the context is primary, not the actual relatedness. Similarly, social bonding and social behaviours between maternal siblings (and occasionally between other maternal relatives) is context-driven in primates, and mediated via the care-giver.

Holland also notes how Bowlby and colleagues' attachment theory was strongly informed by primate bonding patterns and mechanisms, and that in Bowlby's later writing the then emerging inclusive fitness theory was explicitly linked to.

[Bowlby's] work demonstrated that social attachments form on the basis of provision of care, and responsiveness to elicitations for care. The social context of living together and the familiarity this brings, provides the circumstance within which social bonds can form...

On the basis of combining more recent primate research with the findings of attachment theory, Holland proposes that "In attempting to define more specific forms of the giving of care and nurture which may mediate social bonding we [find] that provision of food is likely to play a part, as well as the more intangible provision of warmth and comfort, and a safe base for sleeping."

=== Processual and nurture kinship in humans ===
Holland claims that, while biological theory of social behavior is not deterministic in respect of genetic relatedness vis-a-vis the formation of social bonds and expression of social behaviors, evidence does point to compatibility between a non-reductive interpretation of the theory and how such bonds and behaviors operate in social mammals, primates and in humans. In the final part of the book, Holland explores the extent to which this perspective is also compatible with sociocultural anthropology's ethnographic accounts of human kinship and social behavior, both occasional accounts from the past, as well as more contemporary accounts that have explicitly eschewed the earlier 'blood ties' assumption. Holland finds that;

Many contemporary accounts focus on social bonds formed in childhood and the importance of the performance of acts of care, including food provision, in mediating these bonds. In all cases it is this performance of care which is considered the overriding factor in mediating social bonds, notwithstanding 'blood ties'. In short, there is strong compatibility between the perspectives on social bonding that emerge from a proper account of biological theory and those documented by ethnographers.

=== Conclusion ===
Holland's concluding chapter gives a summary of his fundamental position;

A crucial implication of this argument taken as a whole is that the expression of the kinds of social behaviours treated by inclusive fitness theory does not require genetic relatedness. Sociobiology and evolutionary psychology's claims that biological science predicts that organisms will direct social behaviour towards relatives are thus both theoretically and empirically erroneous. Such claims and their supporting arguments also give a highly misleading and reductive account of basic biological theory. Properly interpreted, cultural anthropology approaches (and ethnographic data) and biological approaches are perfectly compatible regarding processes of social bonding in humans. Most of all, this requires a focus on the circumstances and processes which lead to social bonding.

The book notes that, as an outcome of the analysis, David M. Schneider's sociocultural perspective on human kinship is vindicated;

Do the biological facts have some priority or are they but one of the conditions, like ecology, economy, demography, etc., to which kinship systems must adapt? Take note: if the latter is the case, then kinship must be as much rooted in these other conditions as in the biological facts.

The author supplies several examples of the insight that Schneider's broad approach can provide. The book closes with an example of a clash of cultural perspectives on kinship and family norms, and makes the suggestion that;

Constructing from narrow cultural particulars (Euro-American or otherwise) an essentialised model of 'human nature' does not constitute science; it is closer to cultural colonialism. In any analysis intended to shed light on proposed universals of the human condition, reflexivity is essential, and cultural and biological approaches both surely necessary.

== Reception and reviews ==
=== General ===
Kinship theorist and member of the US National Academy of Sciences, Robin Fox wrote of the work:

An excellent and constructive discussion of matters in kinship and its cultural and biological components, handsomely reconciling what have been held to be incompatible positions.
Max Holland gets to the heart of the matter concerning the contentious relationship between kinship categories, genetic relatedness and the prediction of behavior. If he had been in the debate in the 1980s then a lot of subsequent confusion could have been avoided"

Irwin Bernstein, distinguished research professor in the university of Georgia's Behavioral and Brain Sciences Program made the following comment on Holland's book:

Max Holland has demonstrated extraordinarily thorough scholarship in his exhaustive review of the often contentious discussions of kinship. He has produced a balanced synthesis melding the two approaches exemplified in the biological and sociocultural behavioral positions. His work in reconciling opposing views clearly demonstrates the value of interdisciplinary approaches. This should be the definitive word on the subject.

Philip Kitcher, John Dewey Professor of Philosophy, and James R. Barker Professorship of Contemporary Civilization at Columbia University, past president of the American Philosophical Association and inaugural winner of the Prometheus Prize, stated of the book:

Max Holland has provided a wide-ranging and deeply-probing analysis of the influence of genetic relatedness and social context on human kinship. He argues that while genetic relatedness may play a role in the evolution of social behavior, it does not determine the forms of such behavior. His discussion is exemplary for its thoroughness, and should inspire more nuanced ventures in applying Darwinian approaches to sociocultural anthropology.

=== Sociocultural anthropology ===
Kirk Endicott, professor emeritus of anthropology at the university of Dartmouth, wrote that Holland's book was:

A brilliant discussion of the relationship between kinship and social bonding as understood in evolutionary biology and in sociocultural anthropology. Among other contributions, it debunks the common misconception that biological evolution involves individual organisms actively pursuing the goal of increasing the numbers of their genes in successive generations, the measure of their so-called 'individual inclusive fitness'. Holland demonstrates that an alternative non-deterministic interpretation of evolutionary biology is more compatible with actual human social behavior and with the frameworks that sociocultural anthropology employs.

Janet Carsten, kinship theorist and professor of anthropology at the university of Edinburgh stated that:

This book is a scholarly attempt to get beyond the often sterile oppositions between evolutionary and culturalist approaches to kinship. In bringing together two sides of the debate, it constitutes a valuable contribution to kinship studies.

In a review for the journal Critique of Anthropology, Nicholas Malone concluded that:

Lucid and effective... Holland has produced a significant work of scholarship that will be of interest to a wide swath of the anthropological community.

Commenting on the book for the journal Social Analysis, Anni Kajanus found that:

Holland has done an excellent and thorough job in reviewing the disciplinary and interdisciplinary histories of approaches to kinship and social bonds in anthropology, biology, and psychology. Most importantly, he clarifies the different levels of analysis when looking at human behavior in real time and in the evolutionary time frame. This makes the book essential reading for anyone who acknowledges that human relatedness and social bonds are shaped by the evolved dispositions of our species, their development through the life-course of an individual, and our specific cultural-historical environments... Holland's book goes a long way toward clarifying and therefore advancing these theoretical debates

=== Biology ===
An in-depth review of the book by primatologist Augusto Vitale, in the journal Folia Primatologica, found that:

This is, without a doubt, a very significant and important contribution to the on-going discussion about the determinants of sociality in humans as well as in other animals... A painstaking analysis of inclusive fitness, attachment theory and non-human primate social relationships, through a fascinating journey which ends with an anthropological account of social bonds in different cultures... It is a landmark in the field of evolutionary biology, which places genetic determinism in the correct perspective.

Stuart Semple, evolutionary anthropologist, reviewing the book in the journal Acta Ethologica stated that:

As someone who teaches behavioural ecology to biologists, and primate biology to social and biological anthropologists, I will be strongly recommending this book to all of my advanced undergraduates, masters and PhD students, as well as to my colleagues. Not only does it help to resolve debates that have run for many years, but it is also an outstanding example of what can be achieved by immersing oneself in literature from different fields, while retaining an intellectual openness and exercising incisive analysis. Many of us talk enthusiastically about inter- and multi-disciplinarity, but often this is not much more than lip service. This book is a shining example of what can be achieved when excellent scholars engage fully across disciplinary boundaries. There should be more texts like this.

== Published debate and criticism of the book ==
In addition to praise for the book's significance, the Folia Primatologica review noted that the book is at times too dense and requires close reading;

The argument here and there becomes too detailed and tortuous, but it is absolutely captivating... [Colleagues] who are less used to extremely detailed theoretical reasoning, will find it difficult at the beginning...

== See also ==
- Fictive kinship
- Inclusive fitness
- Kin recognition
- Kin selection
- Kinship
- Nurture kinship
- Scientific method
- Social animal
