= Milk kinship =

Type of fostering allegiance formed during nursing by a non-biological mother

Milk kinship, formed during nursing by a non-biological mother, was a form of fostering allegiance with fellow community members. This particular form of kinship did not exclude particular groups, such that class and other hierarchal systems did not matter in terms of milk kinship participation.

Traditionally speaking, this practice predates the early modern period, though it became a widely used mechanism for developing alliances in many hierarchical societies during that time. Milk kinship used the practice of breast feeding by a wet nurse to feed a child either from the same community, or a neighbouring one. This wet nurse played the strategic role in forging relations between her family and the family of the child she was nursing, as well as their community.

== Strategic reasons for milk kinship ==
"Colactation links two families of unequal status and creates a durable and intimate bond; it removes from 'clients' their outsider status but excludes them as marriage partners...it brings about a social relationship that is an alternative to kinship bonds based on blood." People of different races and religions could be brought together strategically through the bonding of the milk mother and their milk 'children'.

=== Lower social class ===
Milk kinship was as relevant for peasants as 'fostering' or as 'hosting' other children, in that it secured the good will from their masters and their wives. As previously mentioned the milk women's family is the 'core range' to the child she is nursing and they become milk kin, which may strategically be useful for the future if the child is from a higher class family, as the milk women's children will become 'milk-brothers' and 'milk-sisters.' Thus peasant women would most often play the role of the 'milk' mother to her non-biological children, and they held an important role in maintaining the connection between herself and the master whose baby she is nursing. It was also a practical way to assist families who were of a very ill mother or whose mother died in childbirth. This would have been helpful in many societies where, especially in times of war, if families perished, other members of society would end up co-parenting through the link of milk-kinship.

=== Higher social class ===
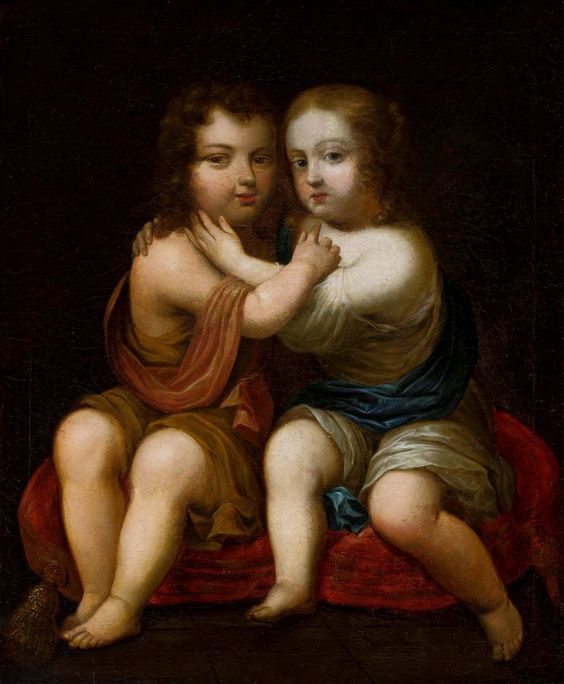
Portrait of Louis XIV of France as a child with his milk-sister Henrietta of England by circle of Pierre Mignard, c. 1646, National Museum in Warsaw

Noble offspring were often sent to milk kin fosterers that would foster them to maturity so that the children would be raised by their successive status subordinates. The purpose of this was for political importance to build milk kin as bodyguards. This was a major practice in the Hindu Kush society.

== Conflicting theories, ideas and myths ==
One particular theory mentioned by Peter Parkes is an Arab folk-analogy that breast milk is supposed to be "transformed male semen" that arises from Héritier's Somatic Scheme. There is no evidence that Arabs ever considered a mother's milk to be 'transformed sperm'. Another suggested analogy is that breast milk was a refinement of uterine blood. It is also suggested since that milk is of the woman, her moods and dispositions are transferred through the breast milk. Parkes mentions that milk-kinship was "further endorsed as a canonical impediment to marriage by several eastern Christian churches". This indicates that this procedure was widely practiced among numerous religious communities, not just Islamic communities, in the early modern Mediterranean.

=== Héritier's somatic thesis ===
Soraya Altorki (1980) published a pioneering article on Sunni Arab notions of kinship created through suckling breast milk (Arabic: rida'a orrada'). Altorki indicated that milk kinship had received little attention from anthropologists, despite its recognised significance in Muslim family law as a complex impediment to marriage. Milk kinship has since attracted further fieldwork throughout Islamic Asia and North Africa, demonstrating its importance as a culturally distinctive institution of adoptive affiliation.

Héritier's somatic thesis posits that Islamic marriage between milk kin is forbidden because of an ancient pre-Islamic concept that is communicated in the Arab saying 'the milk is from the man'. Héritier's somatic explanation has since been endorsed – and apparently confirmed – by several French ethnographers of the Maghreb, also being further developed in her monograph on incest.

In reaction, a few scholars have cited Islamic commentaries and jurisprudence. "A child is the product of the conjoint seed of man and woman . . . but milk is the property of woman alone; one should not conflate by analogy (qiyas) milk with male semen." Al-Qurtubi, Jami' al-ahkam V.83, cited in Benkheira (2001a: 26). The rules of Sunni marital incest apply through a standard of adoptive kin relations. But the modern jurisprudence does not negate nor explain the origin of the taboo.

Héritier explains Islamic juridical reckonings of milk kinship as the continuation of a somatic scheme of male filiative substances transmitted by lactation. But Parker critically interrogates its supposition of a peculiar Arab folk-physiology of lactation, whereby breast milk is supposed to be transformed male semen, yet mentions that Héritier has properly focused attention on evidently contested issues of 'patrifiliation' by breast-feeding, which remain to be understood. Parker posits that this somatic scheme seems to be unsubstantiated by current ethnographies, and also unwarranted in understanding the juridical reckoning of milk kinship that it purports to explain.

== Practices in different societies ==
=== In Eastern Christianity ===
Weisner-Hanks mentions the introduction in the fifteenth century of prohibitions in the Christian Canon Law, in which one is not allowed to marry any one suspected to be of respective kin. Individuals who shared godparents, and great grandparents were prohibited against marrying. The prohibitions against marriage also extended to that of natural godparents. This was because both natural and 'foster' or 'spiritual' parents had an investment on the child's spiritual well being, which would not be achieved by going against Canon Law. The practice of milk kinship is paralleled quite frequently, among scholarly works, with that of Christian godparent-hood or spiritual kinship. Parkes states that in both milk kinship and god-or co-parenthood "we deal with a fictitious kinship relationship between people of unequal status that is embedded in a long-term exchange of goods and services that we know as patronage". Iranians seemed to have "taken care to confine delegated suckling to subordinate non-kin – particularly those with whom marriage would be undesirable in any event". Marriage taboos due to milk kinship were taken very seriously since some regarded breast milk to be refined female blood from the womb, thus conveying a 'uterine substance' of kinship. Children who were milk kin to each other were prohibited to marry as well as two children from different parents who were suckled by the same woman. It was as much of a taboo to marry your milk-brother or -sister, as it was to marry a biological brother or sister. It is extremely important to understand that in all cases "What is forbidden by blood kinship is equally forbidden by milk kinship".

=== In Islamic societies ===
In the early modern period, milk kinship was widely practiced in many Arab countries for both religious and strategic purposes. Like the Christian practice of godparenting, milk kinship established a second family that could take responsibility for a child whose biological parents came to harm. "Milk kinship in Islam thus appears to be a culturally distinctive, but by no means unique, institutional form of adoptive kinship."

The childhood of the Islamic prophet, Muhammad, illustrates the practice of traditional Arab milk kinship. In his early childhood, he was sent away to foster-parents amongst the Bedouin. By nursing him, Halimah bint Abdullah became his "milk-mother". The rest of her family was drawn into the relationship as well: her husband al-Harith became Muhammad's "milk-father", and Muhammad was raised alongside their biological children as a "milk-brother". This milk kinship creates a familial relationship, such that a man may not marry his milk-mother or his milk-sister (the daughter or milk-daughter of his milk-mother).

=== In Native American societies ===
When Crazy Horse, a 19th-century Lakotan chief, was a baby, he nursed at the breast of every woman in the tribe. The Sioux raised their children that way. Every warrior called every old woman in the tribe "Mother". Every old warrior, they called him "Grandfather".

== See also ==
- Affinity (Catholic canon law) marriages prohibited due to marriage or sexual intercourse
- Consanguinity marriages prohibited due to blood relations
- Fictive kin – Anthropological concept
- Godparent – Person who sponsors a child's baptism
- Inclusive fitness in humans
- Rada (fiqh)
- Wet nurse – Woman who breastfeeds and cares for another's child

== Bibliography ==
- Altorki. Soraya. 1980. 'Milk Kinship in Arab Society: An Unexplored Problem in the Ethnography of Marriage', Ethnology, 19 (2): 233–244
- El Guindi, Fadwa. 'Milk and Blood: Kinship among Muslim Arabs in Quatar', Anthropos: International Review of Anthropology and Linguistics, 107 (2): 545–555.View
- Ensel, R. 2002. 'Colactation and fictive kinship as rites of incorporation and reversal in Morocco', Journal of North African Studies 7: 83–96.
- Giladi, A. 1998. 'Breast-feeding in medieval Islamic thought. A preliminary study of legal and medical writings', Journal of Family History 23: 107–23.
- Giladi. A. 1999. Infants, parents and wet nurses. Medieval Islamic views on Breast-feeding and their social implications. Leiden: Brill.
- Parkes, Peter. 2005. 'Milk Kinship in Islam. Substance, Structure, History', Social Anthropology 13 (3) 307–329.
- Soler, Elena. 2010. "Parentesco de leche y movilidad social. La nodriza pasiega" Giovanni Levi (coord) Familias, jerarquización y movilidad social. Edit.um
- Weisner-Hanks, M. 2006. Early Modern Europe, 1450–1789. New York: Cambridge University Press. p. 74.
- Moore, H. and Galloway, J. 1992. We Were Soldiers Once... And Young. New York: Random House.
