= Breastfeeding in Islam =

Breastfeeding is highly regarded in Islam. The Qur'an regards it as a sign of love between the mother and child. In Islamic law, breastfeeding creates ties of milk kinship (known as raḍāʿ or riḍāʿa (Arabic: رضاع, رضاعة pronounced [riˈdˤaːʕ(a)])) that has implications in family law. Muslims throughout the world have varied breastfeeding traditions.

== Quran and hadith ==
Several Qur'anic verses, all dating from the Medinan period, lay down the Islamic ethic of breastfeeding Quran 28:7 and Quran 28:12 refer to the nursing of Islamic prophet Moses to emphasize the loving bond between baby Moses and his mother. Breastfeeding is implied as a basic Maternal bond in Quran 22:2, which considers a mother neglecting nursing of her child as an unusual sign.

Breastfeeding is considered a basic right of every infant, according to the Qur'an. Quran 2:233. In the case where the child's mother has been divorced by the child's father before or after delivery within the breastfeeding period, the Qur'an also calls on fathers to sponsor the child's nursing by providing food and clothing for the child's mother for duration of breastfeeding, although it allows for earlier weaning of the child by mutual consent of both mother and father. The same verse also allows for motherly breastfeeding to be substituted by wet nursing. Quran 65:6–7 expects the father of the child to be generous towards the wet nurse.

The Quran regards ties due to milk kinship similar to ties due to blood kinship. Therefore Quran 4:23 prohibits a man from having sexual relations with his "milk mother" or "milk sister"; hadith explain that the wet-nurse's husband is also included as a milk kin, eg. a woman may not marry her wet-nurse's husband. According to scholars, this prohibition is not found in the Jewish and Christian tradition, though it is found in matrilineal groups.

== In Islamic law ==
Breastfeeding is considered one of the most fundamental rights of a child in Islamic law. Muslim jurists have given extensive treatment to this topic, for example Al-Mawardi (d. 1058) wrote an entire treatise, Kitab al-rada, on the topic of breastfeeding. This includes the specifics related to the right of being breastfed, as well as implications of breastfeeding on prohibiting marriage between individuals related by milk kinship.

=== Right to breastfeeding ===
If the mother is unable to breastfeed the child, then the father must pay a wet nurse to do so. If the parents of the child are divorced, the father must compensate his former wife with payments during breastfeeding. The Jafaris hold that a mother has the right to compensation for breastfeeding even if the parents are married. However, the Sunni schools of thought disagree, arguing the father is not obligated to pay the mother if the two are divorced; the wife already has the right to maintenance (food and clothing) under Islamic law.

Some opinions hold that a mother has the right to breastfeed her children, but can choose not to if she wishes. This is an extension of the general principle, in Islamic law, that a mother has the right to raise her children, but she may renounce this right as it is not her duty.

=== Breastfeeding in Ramadan ===
If a woman is breastfeeding, they do not have to fast during Ramadan, but they can choose to fast if they want to. Fasting can cause difficulties in breastfeeding.

=== Milk kinship for infants ===
The Qur'an regards breastfeeding to establish milk kinship which has implications for marriage.

Islamic jurisprudence extensively discusses the precise delineation of which relationships are subject to prohibition once the milk relationship is established. Shi'ite Islam also prohibits marriage to the consanguineous kin of a milk-parent as per the Qur'an. In Shi'ite societies, the wet nurse was always from a subordinate group, so that marriage to her kin would not have been likely. Texts mentioned that Ahmad ibn Hanbal, founder of the Hanbali school of jurisprudence, also dealt with similar questions.

The minimum number of sucklings necessary to establish the milk-kinship has been the subject of extensive debate. For the adherents of older schools of law, such as the Malikis and Hanafis, one suckling was enough. Others, such as the Shafiʿis, maintain that the minimum number was five or ten, arguing that a Qur'ānic verse had once stipulated this number until had been abrogated from the Qur'ānic text, but the ruling was still in place. Imam Malik, however, believed that the ruling was abrogated along with the wording.

Breastfeeding in infancy is also used as a method to formally adopt a child in Islam.

== Adult suckling ==
The following tradition (hadith) treats both this topic as well as that of rada al-kabir (Arabic: رضاع الكبير, romanized: radāʿ al-kabīr lit. 'suckling of an adult' or 'breastfeeding an adult') along with the number of sucklings:

Urwah ibn al-Zubayr reports that the Prophet commanded the wife of Abū Hudhayfa to feed her husband's mawlā [i.e. servant], Sālim, so that he could go on living with them [upon attaining manhood].

For most jurists (Ibn Hazm being one prominent exception), the bar to marriage was effective only if the nursling was an infant. Yet even these allowed that a new relationship resulted between the two; Ibn Rushd, for example, ruled that the woman could now comport herself more freely in front of the nursed adult male, such as appearing before him unveiled. The traditionist Muhammad al-Bukhari was forced to resign his position of mufti and leave the city of Bukhara after ruling that two nurslings who suckled from the same farm animal became milk-siblings.

== See also ==
- Fiqh
  - Islamic marital jurisprudence
  - Mahram
- Islam and children
- Islamic feminism
- Women and Islam
- Milk kinship
