= Nurture =

Process of caring for an organism as it matures

Nurture is the process of caring for an organism as it grows, usually a human. The term nurture is often used in debates such as the nature versus nurture debate as the opposite of "nature", whereby nurture is the process of replicating learned cultural information from one mind to another, and nature is the replication of genetic non-learned behavior.

Nurture is important in the nature versus nurture debate as some people see either nature or nurture as the final outcome of the origins of most of humanity's behaviours. There are many agents of socialization that are responsible, in some respects the outcome of a child's personality, behaviour, thoughts, social and emotional skills, feelings, and mental priorities.

== Attachment and socioemotional development ==
Nurture contributes to our attachment and socioemotional development via bonding and interactions with caregivers, who are responsible for early-year socialisation. These environmental experiences can have long-term consequences across the life course.

Bowlby’s attachment theory explores the effects of early caregiver relationships, whereby parental nurture affects bond formation with infants. The resulting attachment from the degree of caregiver responsiveness or deprivation influences psychological development and interactions with others beyond infancy. This is substantiated in Ainsworth’s Strange Situation study, which assigned attachment styles of secure, avoidant and ambivalent, according to the behaviour observed when infants were separated from and then reunited with their mothers. These can profoundly influence adult personality and life outcomes. The role of nurture is also reflected in different parental styles which may correspond with attachment. For example, evidence from Kuppens & Ceulemans (2018) shows that authoritative parenting (offering emotional support) is linked to more favourable behavioural outcomes in children than authoritarian parenting, which is more punishing.

Secure attachment during infancy highlights the importance of early nurturing environments in our middle childhood emotional operations. Securely attached children express stronger emotional stability, as measured by reduced emotional change when switching from distressing to positive discussions. It is thought that this difference arises due to secure attachment promoting enhanced appraisal of volatile situations, leading to behavioural responses considered more appropriate. Additionally, children’s experiences of trauma, for instance neglect or abuse, may have detrimental impacts on their development, representing a lack of nurture. This trauma can increase later vulnerability to post traumatic stress disorder, which may be mediated by emotional dysregulation, manifesting as challenges in coordinating goal-directed behaviour and putting them at a greater risk of substance abuse disorders or self-injury.

However, the solely environmental perspective has been criticised by some who address the substantial genetic component governing the development of relationships in early-attachment. Children’s variable susceptibility to socialization, including parenting approaches, is evidenced by the complex interplay between gene-environment interaction effects, such as chemical transmission across neurons.

== Cognitive development and learning ==
The behaviorist approach, as initially discussed by Skinner, explores the role of operant conditioning, whereby actions are learnt and subsequently reinforced through imitating others. Behaviours associated with rewards, such as praise when repeating the correct words when learning how to speak, have a greater likelihood of being positively reinforced than those generating punishment (negative reinforcement). Since families and educational settings determine which behaviours are reinforced, this model refutes the view that higher-order cognitive functions are biologically programmed and are instead contextually conditioned.

The social interactionist model of learning, as posited by Vygotsky, affirms the role of nurture in our cognitive development through education systems providing supportive learning environments rather than purely through reinforcement. Children actively learn through engaging with their peers and teachers, considered more knowledgeable others, who scaffold information so that learners can grasp information and complete tasks in which they previously lacked the capacity. This is supported by the zone of proximal development, referring to the cluster of skills and information which the learner has almost understood and can subsequently achieve independently through social interaction, highlighting the importance of external guidance in nurturing development through learning. The Vygotskian intelligence hypothesis further explains that intelligence, rather than existing as an individual trait, is influenced by sociocultural contexts. Education facilitates social cognition through providing cooperative and cultural interactions, in which we communicate with others. This results in potent cognitive representations unique to our species, chiefly perspective-taking, as mentioned by Moll and Tomasello (2007)

Language, acquired through domestic and educational environments, acts as a cognitive tool directed by social context. As is consistent with the Whorfian hypothesis of linguistic relativity, the languages we speak influence our interpretations of the world, signifying nurture.

== Cultural neuroscience ==
Normative peer influence is particularly salient in the adolescent years, in which people are most sensitive to social scrutiny and acceptance, so must gauge who to use social information from. The resulting reward-oriented social behaviour demonstrates that locally adaptive traits can shape our trajectories.

Cultural neuroscience therefore investigates how cultural environments affect brain function and development, demonstrating the psychological impact of nurture in various societies. These cultural differences can manifest through emotional expression, which can contribute to variation in our experiences of emotion. Evidence from a sample of young adults from China and the United States (Immordino-Yang et al., 2016) revealed a cultural difference in that the Americans typically showed greater magnitudes of emotional expression. This correlated to differential activation of neural mechanisms in the construction of emotions.

Cultural nurture also categories our thinking styles and display rules, which vary across societies. Individualist societies, such as the United States, stress independence and self-expression, whereas collectivist cultures, including Japan, highlight the importance of community and obedience. Research around responses to the COVID-19 pandemic (Xiao, 2021) showed those with a vertical collectivist orientation, which emphasises group harmony, expressed a greater willingness to comply with health guidance, alluding to the role of nurture from wider society in shaping our psychology.

== Epigenetics and neuroplasticity ==
Neuroplasticity refers to the ability of the brain in reorganizing and forming novel neuronal connections following environmental changes. A notable study by Maguire et al (2000) found that London taxi drivers, who are expected to learn detailed maps of London roads, seeing an increase in the size of their posterior hippocampi, which are utilised in spatial memory, correlating to time spent in the occupation. This evidences a capacity for the brain to remould itself based on demand, in this case navigation, showing the importance of nurture.

A growing body of research speaking to the cross-pollination of environmental factors and cognitive processes, has studied the role of epigenetics in demonstrating how nurture can affect our behaviour and development. This refers to the mechanisms by which various life experiences can contribute to heritable alterations in the expression of genes while preserving DNA sequences, contributing to our understanding of psychopathology. Epigenetics also play a role in fostering long-term psychological resilience, in which protective environmental factors, such as parental care, and positive factors, like diet and exercise, may all promote better responses to experienced adversities.
