= Kin selection =

Evolutionary strategy favoring relatives

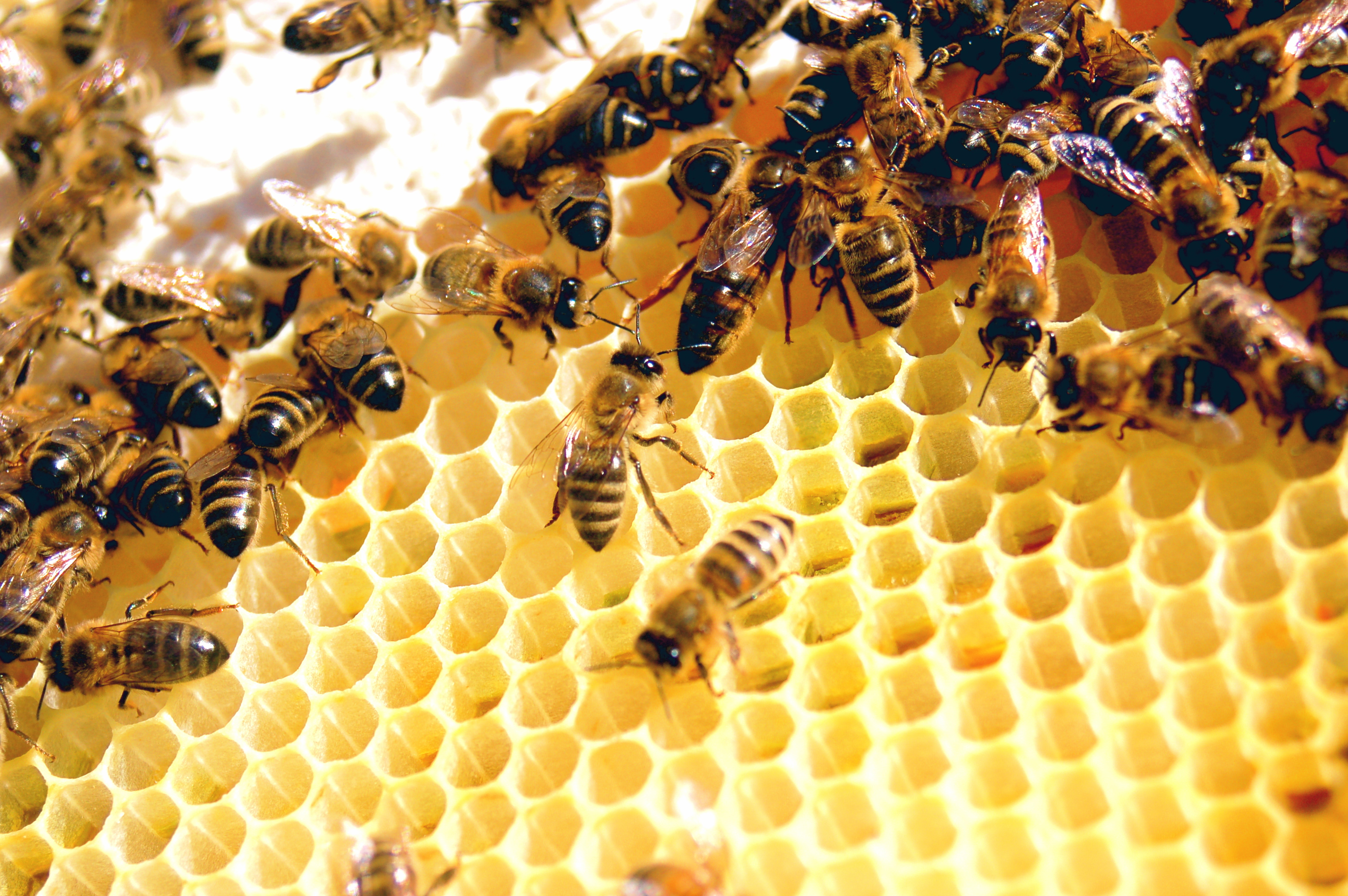
The co-operative behaviour of social insects like the honey bee can be explained by kin selection.

Kin selection is a process whereby natural selection favours a trait due to its positive effects on the reproductive success of an organism's relatives, even when at a cost to the organism's own survival and reproduction. Kin selection can lead to the evolution of altruistic behaviour. It is related to inclusive fitness, which combines the number of offspring produced with the number an individual can ensure the production of by supporting others (weighted by the relatedness between individuals). A broader definition of kin selection includes selection acting on interactions between individuals who share a gene of interest even if the gene is not shared due to common ancestry.

Charles Darwin discussed the concept of kin selection in his 1859 book, On the Origin of Species, where he reflected on the puzzle of sterile social insects, such as honey bees, which leave reproduction to their mothers, arguing that a selection benefit to related organisms (the same "stock") would allow the evolution of a trait that confers the benefit but destroys an individual at the same time. J.B.S. Haldane in 1955 briefly alluded to the principle in limited circumstances (Haldane famously joked that he would willingly die for two brothers or eight cousins), and R.A. Fisher mentioned a similar principle even more briefly in 1930. However, it was not until 1964 that W.D. Hamilton generalised the concept and developed it mathematically (resulting in Hamilton's rule) that it began to be widely accepted. The mathematical treatment was made more elegant in 1970 due to advances made by George R. Price. The term "kin selection" was first used by John Maynard Smith in 1964.

According to Hamilton's rule, kin selection causes genes to increase in frequency when the genetic relatedness of a recipient to an actor multiplied by the benefit to the recipient is greater than the reproductive cost to the actor. Hamilton proposed two mechanisms for kin selection. First, kin recognition allows individuals to be able to identify their relatives. Second, in viscous populations, populations in which the movement of organisms from their place of birth is relatively slow, local interactions tend to be among relatives by default. The viscous population mechanism makes kin selection and social cooperation possible in the absence of kin recognition. In this case, nurture kinship, the interaction between related individuals, simply as a result of living in each other's proximity, is sufficient for kin selection, given reasonable assumptions about population dispersal rates. Kin selection is not the same thing as group selection, where natural selection is believed to act on the group as a whole.

In humans, altruism is both more likely and on a larger scale with kin than with unrelated individuals; for example, humans give presents according to how closely related they are to the recipient. In other species, vervet monkeys use allomothering, where related females such as older sisters or grandmothers often care for young, according to their relatedness. The social shrimp Synalpheus regalis protects juveniles within highly related colonies.

== Historical overview ==
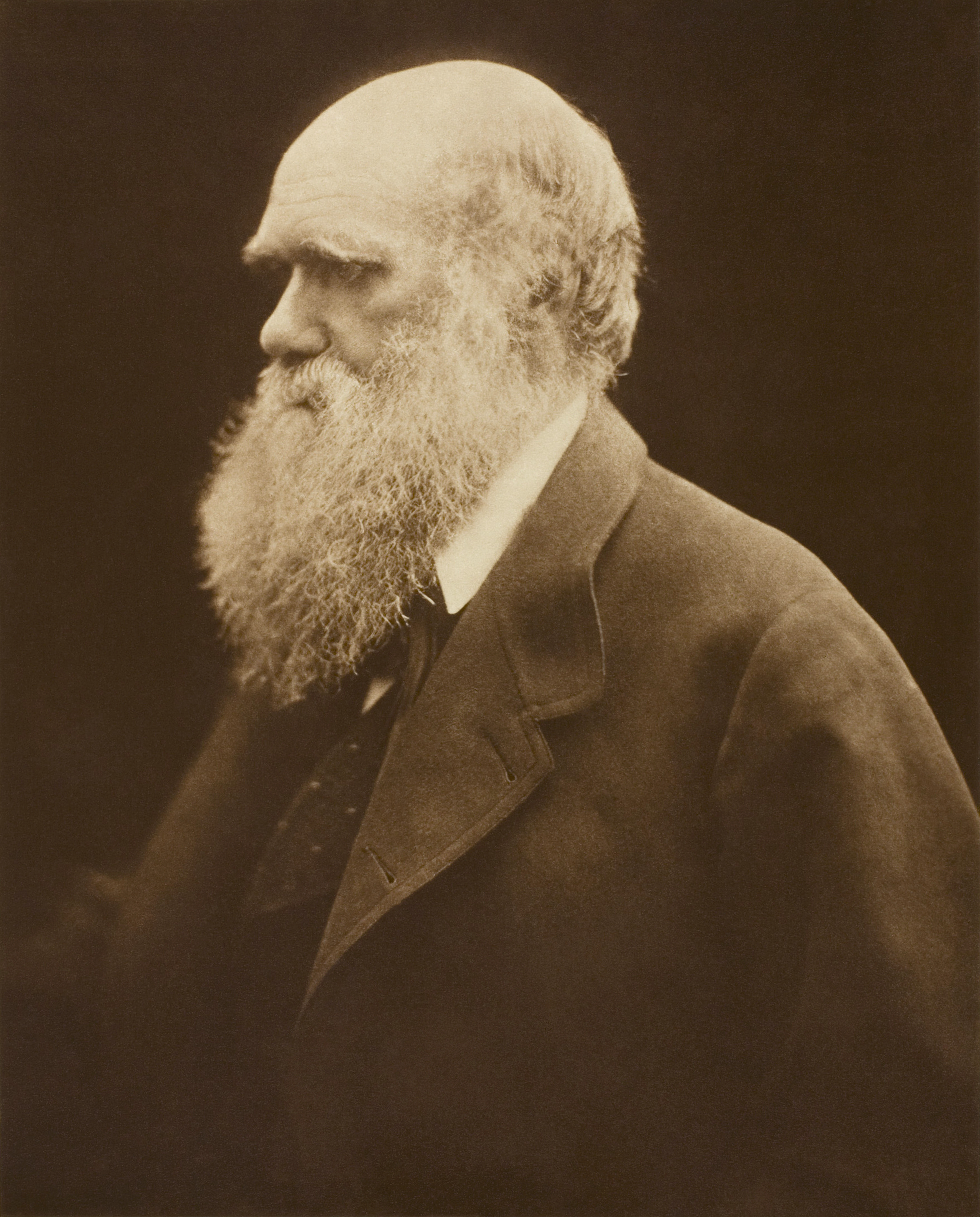
Charles Darwin wrote that selection could be applied to the family as well as to the individual.

Charles Darwin was the first to discuss the concept of kin selection (without using that term). In On the Origin of Species, he wrote about the conundrum represented by altruistic sterile social insects that:

This difficulty, though appearing insuperable, is lessened, or, as I believe, disappears, when it is remembered that selection may be applied to the family, as well as to the individual, and may thus gain the desired end. Breeders of cattle wish the flesh and fat to be well marbled together. An animal thus characterised has been slaughtered, but the breeder has gone with confidence to the same stock and has succeeded.

— Darwin

In this passage "the family" and "stock" stand for a kin group. These passages and others by Darwin about kin selection are highlighted in D.J. Futuyma's textbook of reference Evolutionary Biology and in E. O. Wilson's Sociobiology.

Kin selection was briefly referred to by R.A. Fisher in 1930 and J.B.S. Haldane in 1932 and 1955. J.B.S. Haldane grasped the basic quantities in kin selection, famously writing "I would lay down my life for two brothers or eight cousins". Haldane's remark alluded to the fact that if an individual loses its life to save two siblings, four nephews, or eight cousins, it is a "fair deal" in evolutionary terms, as siblings are on average 50% identical by descent, nephews 25%, and cousins 12.5% (in a diploid population that is randomly mating and previously outbred). But Haldane also joked that he would truly die only to save more than a single identical twin of his or more than two full siblings. In 1955 he clarified:

Let us suppose that you carry a rare gene that affects your behaviour so that you jump into a flooded river and save a child, but you have one chance in ten of being drowned, while I do not possess the gene, and stand on the bank and watch the child drown. If the child's your own child or your brother or sister, there is an even chance that this child will also have this gene, so five genes will be saved in children for one lost in an adult. If you save a grandchild or a nephew, the advantage is only two and a half to one. If you only save a first cousin, the effect is very slight. If you try to save your first cousin once removed the population is more likely to lose this valuable gene than to gain it. … It is clear that genes making for conduct of this kind would only have a chance of spreading in rather small populations when most of the children were fairly near relatives of the man who risked his life.

W. D. Hamilton, in 1963 and especially in 1964 generalised the concept and developed it mathematically, showing that it holds for genes even when they are not rare, deriving Hamilton's rule and defining a new quantity known as an individual's inclusive fitness. He is widely credited as the founder of the field of social evolution. A more elegant mathematical treatment was made possible by George Price in 1970.

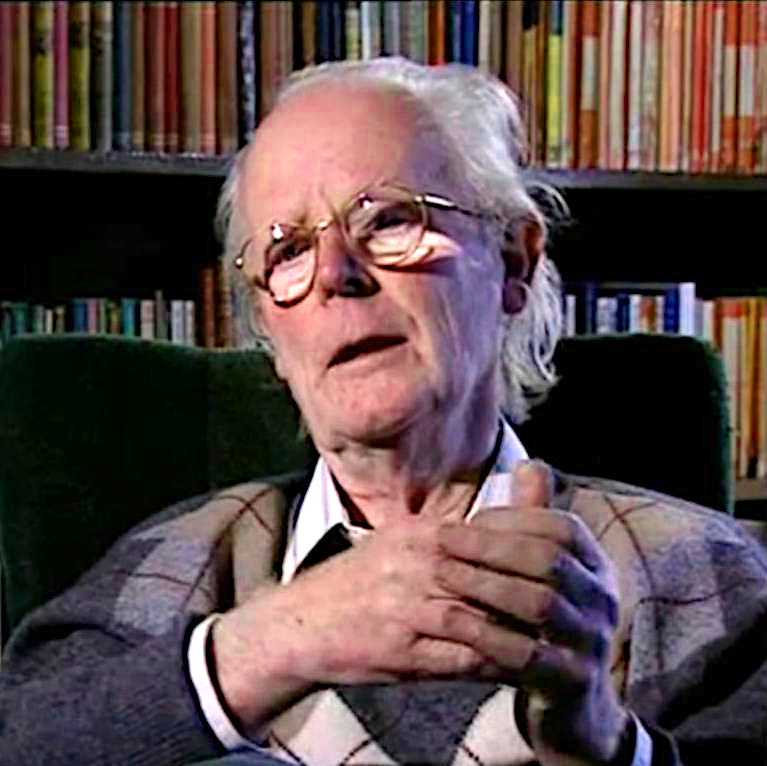
The evolutionary biologist John Maynard Smith used the term "kin selection" in 1964.

John Maynard Smith may have coined the actual term "kin selection" in 1964:

These processes I will call kin selection and group selection respectively. Kin selection has been discussed by Haldane and by Hamilton. … By kin selection I mean the evolution of characteristics which favour the survival of close relatives of the affected individual, by processes which do not require any discontinuities in the population breeding structure.

Kin selection causes changes in gene frequency across generations, driven by interactions between related individuals. This dynamic forms the conceptual basis of the theory of sociobiology. Some cases of evolution by natural selection can only be understood by considering how biological relatives influence each other's fitness. Under natural selection, a gene encoding a trait that enhances the fitness of each individual carrying it should increase in frequency within the population; and conversely, a gene that lowers the individual fitness of its carriers should be eliminated. However, a hypothetical gene that prompts behaviour which enhances the fitness of relatives but lowers that of the individual displaying the behaviour, may nonetheless increase in frequency, because relatives often carry the same gene. According to this principle, the enhanced fitness of relatives can at times more than compensate for the fitness loss incurred by the individuals displaying the behaviour, making kin selection possible. This is a special case of a more general model, "inclusive fitness". This analysis has been challenged, Wilson writing that "the foundations of the general theory of inclusive fitness based on the theory of kin selection have crumbled" and that he now relies instead on the theory of eusociality and "gene-culture co-evolution" for the underlying mechanics of sociobiology. Inclusive fitness theory is still generally accepted however, as demonstrated by the publication of a rebuttal to Wilson's claims in Nature from over a hundred researchers.

Kin selection is contrasted with group selection, according to which a genetic trait can become prevalent within a group because it benefits the group as a whole, regardless of any benefit to individual organisms. All known forms of group selection conform to the principle that an individual behaviour can be evolutionarily successful only if the genes responsible for this behaviour conform to Hamilton's Rule, and hence, on balance and in the aggregate, benefit from the behaviour.

== Hamilton's rule ==
Formally, genes for a particular behavior should increase in frequency when

$$rB > C$$

where

r = the genetic relatedness of the recipient to the actor, often defined as the probability that a gene picked randomly from each at the same locus is identical by descent.
B = the additional reproductive benefit gained by the recipient of the altruistic act,
C = the reproductive cost to the individual performing the act.

This inequality is known as Hamilton's rule after W. D. Hamilton who in 1964 published the first formal quantitative treatment of kin selection.

The relatedness parameter (r) in Hamilton's rule was introduced in 1922 by Sewall Wright as a coefficient of relationship that gives the probability that at a random locus, the alleles there will be identical by descent. Modern formulations of the rule use Alan Grafen's definition of relatedness based on the theory of linear regression.

A 2014 review of many lines of evidence for Hamilton's rule found that its predictions were confirmed in a wide variety of social behaviours across a broad phylogenetic range of birds, mammals and insects, in each case comparing social and non-social taxa. Among the experimental findings, a 2010 study used a wild population of red squirrels in Yukon, Canada. Surrogate mothers adopted related orphaned squirrel pups but not unrelated orphans. The cost of adoption was calculated by measuring a decrease in the survival probability of the entire litter after increasing the litter by one pup, while benefit was measured as the increased chance of survival of the orphan. The degree of relatedness of the orphan and surrogate mother for adoption to occur depended on the number of pups the surrogate mother already had in her nest, as this affected the cost of adoption. Females always adopted orphans when rB was greater than C, but never adopted when rB was less than C, supporting Hamilton's rule. (Note: Further detail of Hamilton's rule is available at Simulating the Evolution of Sacrificing for Family: Discovering the specific definitions of r, B, and C, and at Hamilton's Rule and Its Discontents: Why the general definitions of the variables always applies, but one specific definition can fail.)

== Mechanisms ==
Altruism occurs where the instigating individual suffers a fitness loss while the receiving individual experiences a fitness gain. The sacrifice of one individual to help another is an example.

Hamilton outlined two ways in which kin selection altruism could be favoured:

The selective advantage which makes behaviour conditional in the right sense on the discrimination of factors which correlate with the relationship of the individual concerned is therefore obvious. It may be, for instance, that in respect of a certain social action performed towards neighbours indiscriminately, an individual is only just breaking even in terms of inclusive fitness. If he could learn to recognise those of his neighbours who really were close relatives and could devote his beneficial actions to them alone an advantage to inclusive fitness would at once appear. Thus a mutation causing such discriminatory behaviour itself benefits inclusive fitness and would be selected. In fact, the individual may not need to perform any discrimination so sophisticated as we suggest here; a difference in the generosity of his behaviour according to whether the situations evoking it were encountered near to, or far from, his own home might occasion an advantage of a similar kind.

=== Kin recognition and the green beard effect ===
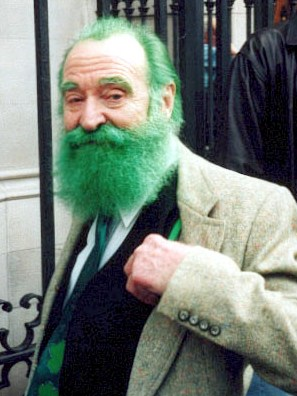
Kin recognition theory predicts a selective advantage for the bearers of a trait (like the fictitious 'green beard') behave altruistically towards others with the same trait.

First, if individuals have the capacity to recognise kin and to discriminate (positively) on the basis of kinship, then the average relatedness of the recipients of altruism could be high enough for kin selection. Because of the facultative nature of this mechanism, kin recognition and discrimination were expected to be unimportant except among 'higher' forms of life. However, as molecular recognition mechanisms have been shown to operate in organisms such as slime moulds kin recognition has much wider importance than previously recognised. Kin recognition may be selected for inbreeding avoidance, and little evidence indicates that 'innate' kin recognition plays a role in mediating altruism. A thought experiment on the kin recognition/discrimination distinction is the hypothetical 'green beard', where a gene for social behaviour is imagined also to cause a distinctive phenotype that can be recognised by other carriers of the gene. Due to conflicting genetic similarity in the rest of the genome, there should be selection pressure for green-beard altruistic sacrifices to be suppressed, making common ancestry the most likely form of inclusive fitness. This suppression is overcome if new phenotypes -other beard colours- are formed through mutation or introduced into the population from time to time. This proposed mechanism goes by the name of 'beard chromodynamics'.

=== Viscous populations ===
Secondly, indiscriminate altruism may be favoured in "viscous" populations, those with low rates or short ranges of dispersal. Here, social partners are typically related, and so altruism can be selective advantageous without the need for kin recognition and kin discrimination faculties—spatial proximity, together with limited dispersal, ensures that social interactions are more often with related individuals. This suggests a rather general explanation for altruism. Directional selection always favours those with higher rates of fecundity within a certain population. Social individuals can often enhance the survival of their own kin by participating in and following the rules of their own group.

Hamilton later modified his thinking to suggest that an innate ability to recognise actual genetic relatedness was unlikely to be the dominant mediating mechanism for kin altruism:

But once again, we do not expect anything describable as an innate kin recognition adaptation, used for social behaviour other than mating, for the reasons already given in the hypothetical case of the trees.

Hamilton's later clarifications often go unnoticed. Stuart West and colleagues have countered the long-standing assumption that kin selection requires innate powers of kin recognition. Another doubtful assumption is that social cooperation must be based on limited dispersal and shared developmental context. Such ideas have obscured the progress made in applying kin selection to species including humans, on the basis of cue-based mediation of social bonding and social behaviours.

== Special cases ==
=== Eusociality ===
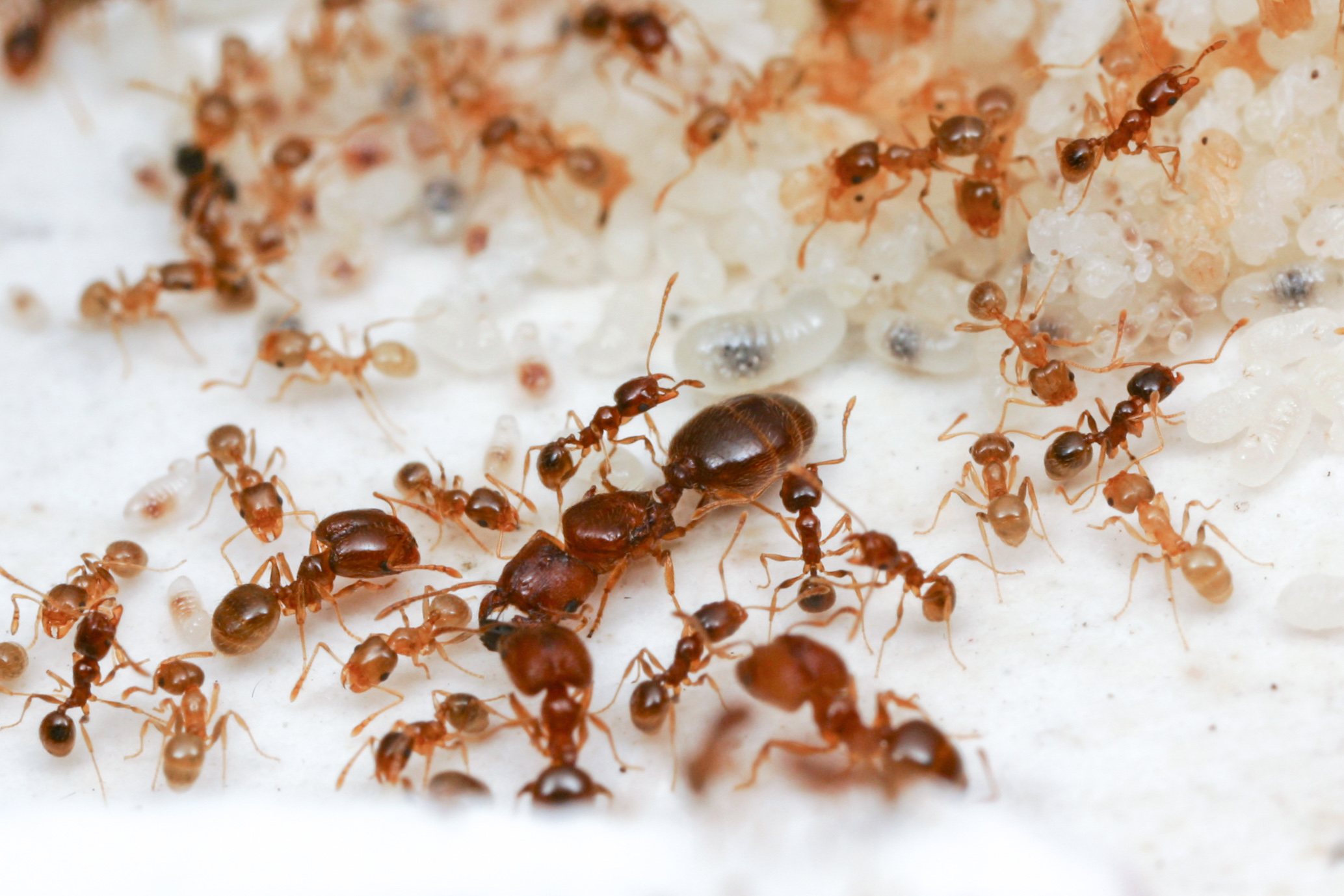
Ants are eusocial insects; the queen (large, centre) is reproductive, while the workers (small) and soldiers (medium size, with large jaws) are generally not.

Eusociality (true sociality) occurs in social systems with three characteristics: an overlap in generations between parents and their offspring, cooperative brood care, and specialised castes of non-reproductive individuals. The social insects provide good examples of organisms with what appear to be kin selected traits. The workers of some species are sterile, a trait that would not occur if individual selection was the only process at work. The relatedness coefficient r is abnormally high between the worker sisters in a colony of Hymenoptera due to haplodiploidy. Hamilton's rule is presumed to be satisfied because the benefits in fitness for the workers are believed to exceed the costs in terms of lost reproductive opportunity, though this has never been demonstrated empirically. Competing hypotheses have been offered to explain the evolution of social behaviour in such organisms.

The eusocial shrimp Synalpheus regalis protects juveniles in the colony. By defending the young, the large defender shrimp can increase its inclusive fitness. Allozyme data demonstrated high relatedness within colonies, averaging 0.50. This means that colonies represent close kin groups, supporting the hypothesis of kin selection.

=== Allomothering ===
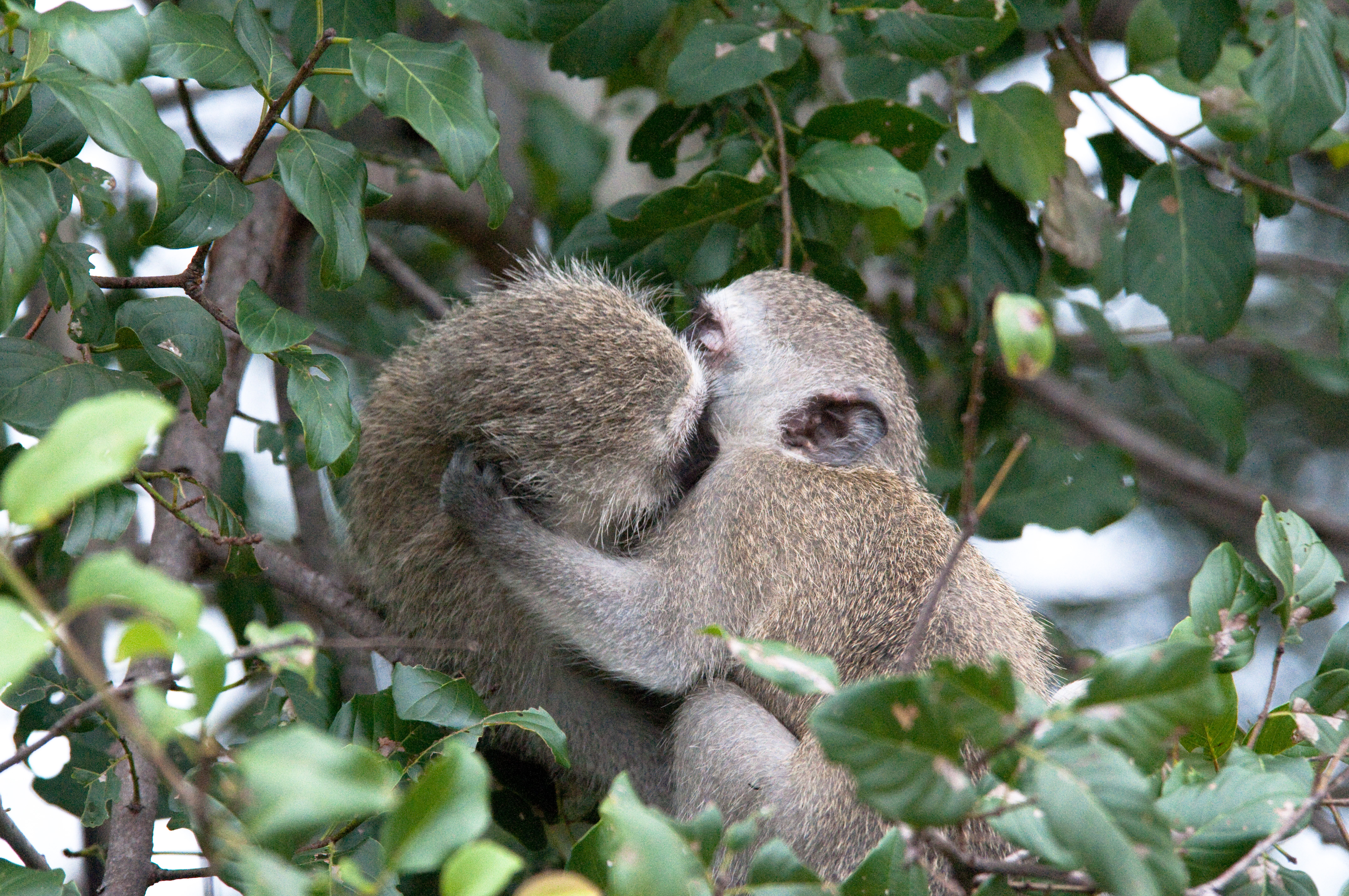
Vervet monkeys behave in ways that imply kin selection.

Vervet monkeys utilise allomothering, parenting by group members other than the actual mother or father, where the allomother is typically an older female sibling or a grandmother. Individuals act aggressively toward other individuals that were aggressive toward their relatives. The behaviour implies kin selection between siblings, between mothers and offspring, and between grandparents and grandchildren.

== In humans ==
Whether or not Hamilton's rule always applies, relatedness is often important for human altruism, in that humans are inclined to behave more altruistically toward kin than toward unrelated individuals. Many people choose to live near relatives, exchange sizeable gifts with relatives, and favour relatives in wills in proportion to their relatedness.

=== Experimental studies, interviews, and surveys ===
Interviews of several hundred women in Los Angeles showed that while non-kin friends were willing to help one another, their assistance was far more likely to be reciprocal. The largest amounts of non-reciprocal help, however, were reportedly provided by kin. Additionally, more closely related kin were considered more likely sources of assistance than distant kin. Similarly, several surveys of American college students found that individuals were more likely to incur the cost of assisting kin when a high probability that relatedness and benefit would be greater than cost existed. Participants' feelings of helpfulness were stronger toward family members than non-kin. Additionally, participants were found to be most willing to help those individuals most closely related to them. Interpersonal relationships between kin in general were more supportive and less Machiavellian than those between non-kin.

In one experiment, the longer participants (from both the UK and the South African Zulus) held a painful skiing position, the more money or food was presented to a given relative. Participants repeated the experiment for individuals of different relatedness (parents and siblings at r=.5, grandparents, nieces, and nephews at r=.25, etc.). The results showed that participants held the position for longer intervals the greater the degree of relatedness between themselves and those receiving the reward.

=== Observational studies ===
A study of food-sharing practices on the West Caroline islets of Ifaluk determined that food-sharing was more common among people from the same islet, possibly because the degree of relatedness between inhabitants of the same islet would be higher than relatedness between inhabitants of different islets. When food was shared between islets, the distance the sharer was required to travel correlated with the relatedness of the recipient—a greater distance meant that the recipient needed to be a closer relative. The relatedness of the individual and the potential inclusive fitness benefit needed to outweigh the energy cost of transporting the food over distance.

Humans may use the inheritance of material goods and wealth to maximise their inclusive fitness. By providing close kin with inherited wealth, an individual may improve his or her kin's reproductive opportunities and thus increase his or her own inclusive fitness even after death. A study of a thousand wills found that the beneficiaries who received the most inheritance were generally those most closely related to the will's writer. Distant kin received proportionally less inheritance, with the least amount of inheritance going to non-kin.

A study of childcare practices among Canadian women found that respondents with children provide childcare reciprocally with non-kin. The cost of caring for non-kin was balanced by the benefit a woman received—having her own offspring cared for in return. However, respondents without children were significantly more likely to offer childcare to kin. For individuals without their own offspring, the inclusive fitness benefits of providing care to closely related children might outweigh the time and energy costs of childcare.

Family investment in offspring among black South African households also appears consistent with an inclusive fitness model. A higher degree of relatedness between children and their caregivers was correlated with a higher degree of investment in the children, with more food, health care, and clothing. Relatedness was also associated with the regularity of a child's visits to local medical practitioners and with the highest grade the child had completed in school, and negatively associated with children being behind in school for their age.

Observation of the Dolgan hunter-gatherers of northern Russia suggested that there are larger and more frequent asymmetrical transfers of food to kin. Kin are more likely to be welcomed to non-reciprocal meals, while non-kin are discouraged from attending. Finally, when reciprocal food-sharing occurs between families, these families are often closely related, and the primary beneficiaries are the offspring.

Violence in families is more likely when step-parents are present, and that "genetic relationship is associated with a softening of conflict, and people's evident valuations of themselves and of others are systematically related to the parties' reproductive values". Numerous studies suggest how inclusive fitness may work amongst different peoples, such as the Ye'kwana of southern Venezuela, the Gypsies of Hungary, and the doomed Donner Party of the United States.

=== Human social patterns ===
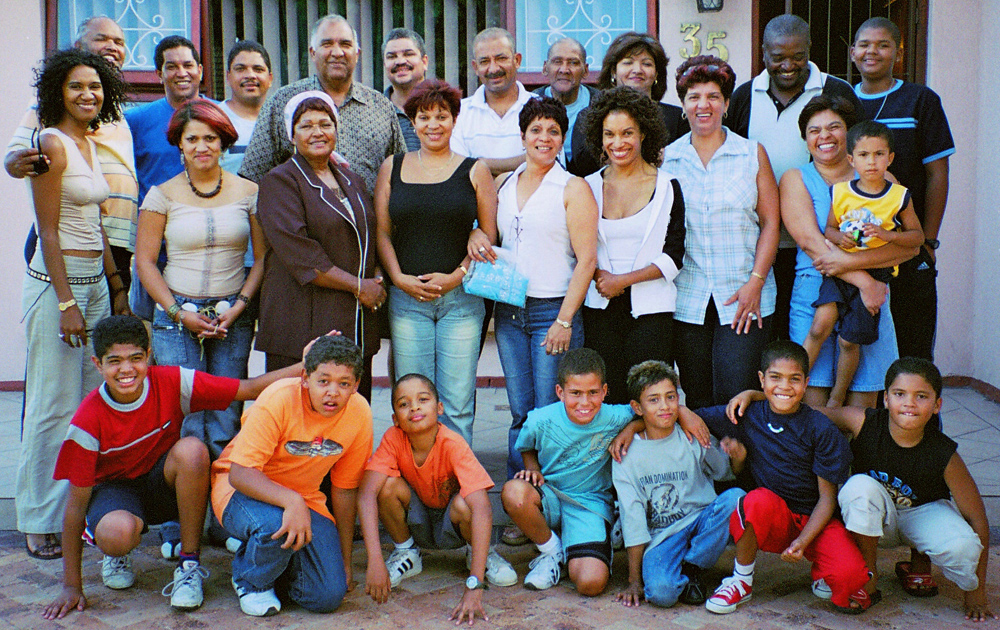
Families are important in human behaviour, but kin selection may be based on closeness and other cues.

Evolutionary psychologists, following early human sociobiologists' interpretation of kin selection theory initially attempted to explain human altruistic behaviour through kin selection by stating that "behaviors that help a genetic relative are favored by natural selection." However, many evolutionary psychologists recognise that this common shorthand formulation is inaccurate:

Many misunderstandings persist. In many cases, they result from conflating "coefficient of relatedness" and "proportion of shared genes", which is a short step from the intuitively appealing—but incorrect—interpretation that "animals tend to be altruistic toward those with whom they share a lot of genes." These misunderstandings don't just crop up occasionally; they are repeated in many writings, including undergraduate psychology textbooks—most of them in the field of social psychology, within sections describing evolutionary approaches to altruism.

As with the earlier sociobiological forays into the cross-cultural data, typical approaches are not able to find explanatory fit with the findings of ethnographers insofar that human kinship patterns are not necessarily built upon blood-ties. However, as Hamilton's later refinements of his theory make clear, it does not simply predict that genetically related individuals will inevitably recognise and engage in positive social behaviours with genetic relatives: rather, indirect context-based mechanisms may have evolved, which in historical environments have met the inclusive fitness criterion. Consideration of the demographics of the typical evolutionary environment of any species is crucial to understanding the evolution of social behaviours. As Hamilton himself put it, "Altruistic or selfish acts are only possible when a suitable social object is available. In this sense behaviours are conditional from the start".

Under this perspective, and noting the necessity of a reliable context of interaction being available, the data on how altruism is mediated in social mammals is readily made sense of. In social mammals, primates and humans, altruistic acts that meet the kin selection criterion are typically mediated by circumstantial cues such as shared developmental environment, familiarity and social bonding. That is, it is the context that mediates the development of the bonding process and the expression of the altruistic behaviours, not genetic relatedness as such. This interpretation is compatible with the cross-cultural ethnographic data and has been called nurture kinship.

== In plants ==
=== Observations ===
Though originally thought unique to the animal kingdom, evidence of kin selection has been identified in the plant kingdom.

Competition for resources between developing zygotes in plant ovaries increases when seeds had been pollinated with male gametes from different plants. How developing zygotes differentiate between full siblings and half-siblings in the ovary is undetermined, but genetic interactions are thought to play a role. Nonetheless, competition between zygotes in the ovary is detrimental to the reproductive success of the (female) plant, and fewer zygotes mature into seeds. As such, the reproductive traits and behaviors of plants suggests the evolution of behaviors and characteristics that increase the genetic relatedness of fertilized eggs in the plant ovary, thereby fostering kin selection and cooperation among the seeds as they develop. These traits differ among plant species. Some species have evolved to have fewer ovules per ovary, commonly one ovule per ovary, thereby decreasing the chance of developing multiple, differently fathered seeds within the same ovary. Multi-ovulated plants have developed mechanisms that increase the chances of all ovules within the ovary being fathered by the same parent. Such mechanisms include dispersal of pollen in aggregated packets and closure of the stigmatic lobes after pollen is introduced. The aggregated pollen packet releases pollen gametes in the ovary, thereby increasing likelihood that all ovules are fertilized by pollen from the same parent. Likewise, the closure of the ovary pore prevents entry of new pollen. Other multi-ovulated plants have evolved mechanisms that mimic the evolutionary adaption of single-ovulated ovaries; the ovules are fertilized by pollen from different individuals, but the mother ovary then selectively aborts fertilized ovules, either at the zygotic or embryonic stage.

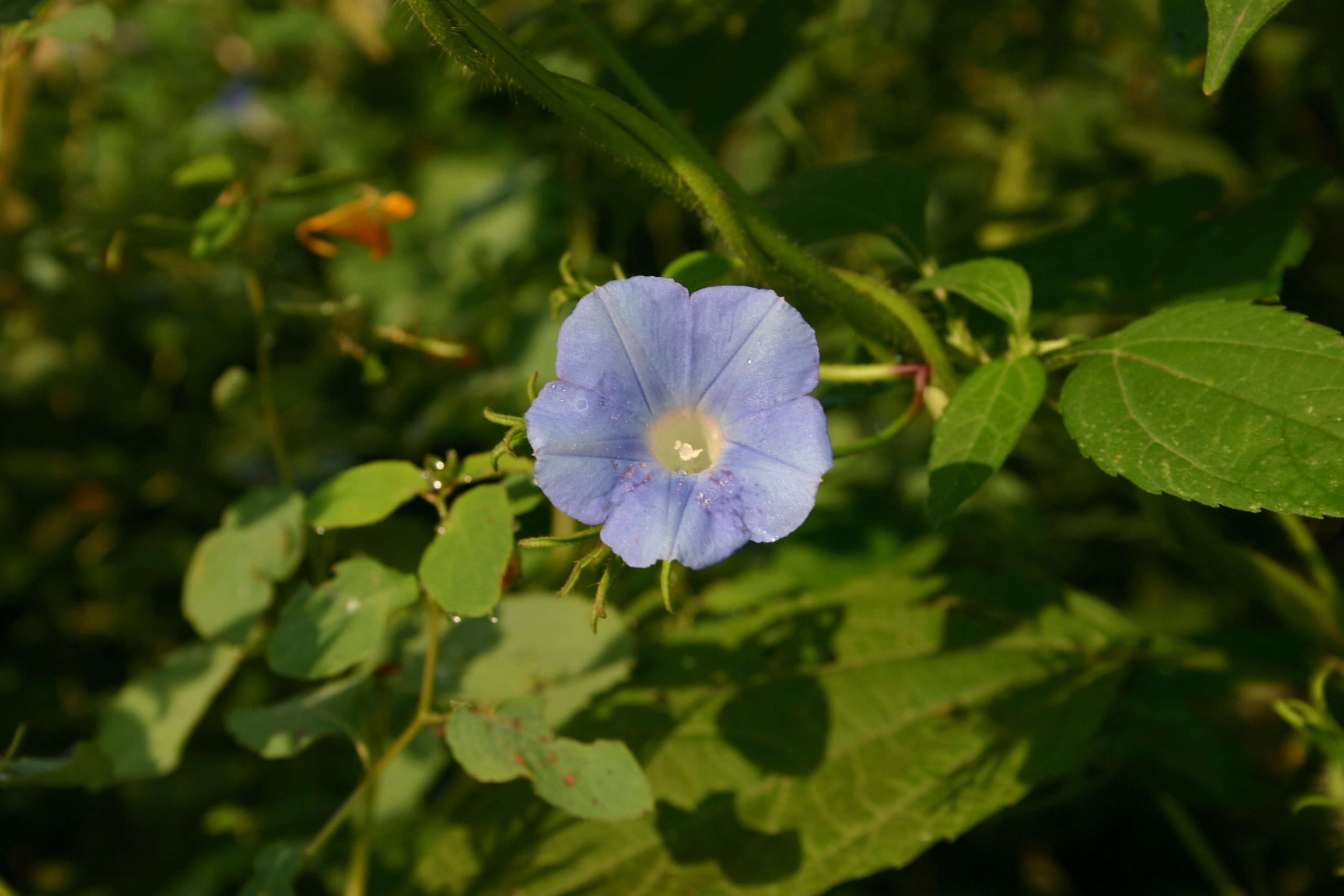
Morning glory plants grow smaller roots when next to kin than to non-kin plants.

After seeds are dispersed, kin recognition and cooperation affects root formation in developing plants. Studies have found that the total root mass developed by Ipomoea hederacea (morning glory shrubs) grown next to kin is significantly smaller than those grown next to non-kin; shrubs grown next to kin thus allocate less energy and resources to growing the larger root systems needed for competitive growth. When seedlings were grown in individual pots placed next to kin or non-kin relatives, no difference in root growth was observed. This indicates that kin recognition occurs via signals received by the roots. Further, groups of I. hederacea plants are more varied in height when grown with kin than when grown with non-kin. The evolutionary benefit provided by this was further investigated by researchers at the Université de Montpellier. They found that the alternating heights seen in kin-grouped crops allowed for optimal light availability to all plants in the group; shorter plants next to taller plants had access to more light than those surrounded by plants of similar height.

The above examples illustrate the effect of kin selection in the equitable allocation of light, nutrients, and water. The evolutionary emergence of single-ovulated ovaries in plants has eliminated the need for a developing seed to compete for nutrients, thus increasing its chance of survival and germination. Likewise, the fathering of all ovules in multi-ovulated ovaries by one father, decreases the likelihood of competition between developing seeds, thereby also increasing the seeds' chances of survival and germination. The decreased root growth in plants grown with kin increases the amount of energy available for reproduction; plants grown with kin produced more seeds than those grown with non-kin. Similarly, the increase in light made available by alternating heights in groups of related plants is associated with higher fecundity.

Kin selection has also been observed in plant responses to herbivory. In an experiment done by Richard Karban et al., leaves of potted Artemisia tridentata (sagebrushes) were clipped with scissors to simulate herbivory. The gaseous volatiles emitted by the clipped leaves were captured in a plastic bag. When these volatiles were transferred to leaves of a closely related sagebrush, the recipient experienced lower levels of herbivory than those that had been exposed to volatiles released by non-kin plants. Sagebrushes do not uniformly emit the same volatiles in response to herbivory: the chemical ratios and composition of emitted volatiles vary from one sagebrush to another. Closely related sagebrushes emit similar volatiles, and the similarities decrease as relatedness decreases. This suggests that the composition of volatile gasses plays a role in kin selection among plants. Volatiles from a distantly related plant are less likely to induce a protective response against herbivory in a neighboring plant, than volatiles from a closely related plant. This fosters kin selection, as the volatiles emitted by a plant will activate the herbivorous defense response in related plants only, thus increasing their chance of survival and reproduction.

Kin selection may play a role in plant-pollinator interactions, especially because pollinator attraction is influenced not only by floral displays, but by the spatial arrangement of plants in a group, which is referred to as the "magnet effect". For example, in an experiment performed on Moricandia moricandioides, Torices et al. demonstrated that focal plants in the presence of kin show increased advertising effort (defined as total petal mass of plants in a group divided by the plant biomass) compared to those in the presence of non-kin, and that this effect is greater in larger groups. M. moricandioides is a good model organism for the study of plant-pollinator interactions because it relies on pollinators for reproduction, as it is self-incompatible. The study design for this experiment included planting establishing pots of M. moricandioides with zero, three or six neighbors (either unrelated or half-sib progeny of the same mother) and advertising effort was calculated after 26 days of flowering. The exact mechanism of kin recognition in M. moricandioides is unknown, but possible mechanisms include above-ground communication with volatile compounds, or below-ground communication with root exudates.

=== Mechanisms in plants ===
The ability to differentiate between kin and non-kin is not necessary for kin selection in many animals. However, because plants do not reliably germinate in close proximity to kin, it is thought that, within the plant kingdom, kin recognition is especially important for kin selection there, but the mechanism remains unknown.

One proposed mechanism for kin recognition involves communication through roots, with secretion and reception of root exudates. This would require exudates to be actively secreted by roots of one plant, and detected by roots of neighboring plants. The root exudate allantoin produced by rice plants, Oryza sativa, has been documented to be in greater production when growing next to cultivars that are largely unrelated. High production levels of Allantoin correlated to up regulation of auxin and auxin transporters, resulting in increased lateral root development and directional growth of their roots towards non kin, maximizing competition. This is mainly not observed in Oryza Sativa when surrounded by kin, invoking altruistic behaviors to promote inclusive fitness. However the root receptors responsible for recognition of kin exudates, and the pathway induced by receptor activation, remain unknown. The mycorrhiza associated with roots might facilitate reception of exudates, but again the mechanism is unknown.

Another possibility is communication through green leaf volatiles. Karban et al. studied kin recognition in sagebrushes, Artemisia tridentata. The volatile-donating sagebrushes were kept in individual pots, separate from the plants that received the volatiles, finding that plants responded to herbivore damage to a neighbour's leaves. This suggests that root signalling is not necessary to induce a protective response against herbivory in neighbouring kin plants. Karban et al. suggest that plants may be able to differentiate between kin and non-kin based on the composition of volatiles. Because only the recipient sagebrush's leaves were exposed the volatiles presumably activated a receptor protein in the plant's leaves. The identity of this receptor, and the signalling pathway triggered by its activation, both remain to be discovered.

== Objections ==
The theory of kin selection has been criticised by W. J. Alonso (in 1998) and by Alonso and C. Schuck-Paim (in 2002). They argue that the behaviours which kin selection attempts to explain are not altruistic (in pure Darwinian terms) because: (1) they may directly favour the performer as an individual aiming to maximise its progeny (so the behaviours can be explained as ordinary individual selection); (2) these behaviours benefit the group (so they can be explained as group selection); or (3) they are by-products of a developmental system of many "individuals" performing different tasks (like a colony of bees, or the cells of multicellular organisms, which are the focus of selection). They also argue that the genes involved in sex ratio conflicts could be treated as "parasites" of (already established) social colonies, not as their "promoters", and, therefore the sex ratio in colonies would be irrelevant to the transition to eusociality. Those ideas were mostly ignored until they were put forward again in a series of controversial papers by E. O. Wilson, Bert Hölldobler, Martin Nowak and Corina Tarnita. Nowak, Tarnita and Wilson argued that

Inclusive fitness theory is not a simplification over the standard approach. It is an alternative accounting method, but one that works only in a very limited domain. Whenever inclusive fitness does work, the results are identical to those of the standard approach. Inclusive fitness theory is an unnecessary detour, which does not provide additional insight or information.

— Nowak, Tarnita, and Wilson

They, like Alonso and Schuck-Paim, argue for a multi-level selection model instead. This aroused a strong response, including a rebuttal published in Nature from over a hundred researchers.

== See also ==
- Darwinian anthropology
- Group selection
- Price equation
- The Selfish Gene
- Genomic imprinting
- Hamiltonian spite
