= Kin recognition =

Ability of an organism to distinguish between close genetic kin and non-kin

Kin recognition, also called kin detection, is an organism's ability to distinguish between close genetic kin and non-kin. In evolutionary biology and evolutionary psychology, such an ability is presumed to have evolved for inbreeding avoidance. While a 2021 meta-analysis of research across 88 diploid species found that animals rarely avoid inbreeding, avoidance is more common in species with developmental co-residence since the latter is a proxy for kin recognition.

An additional adaptive function sometimes posited for kin recognition is a role in kin selection. There is debate over this, since in strict theoretical terms kin recognition is not necessary for kin selection or the cooperation associated with it. Rather, social behaviour can emerge by kin selection in the demographic conditions of 'viscous populations' with organisms interacting in their natal context, without active kin discrimination, since social participants by default typically share recent common origin. Since kin selection theory emerged, much research has been produced investigating the possible role of kin recognition mechanisms in mediating altruism. Some researchers suggest that, taken as a whole, active powers of recognition play a negligible role in mediating social cooperation relative to less elaborate cue-based and context-based mechanisms, such as familiarity and imprinting, whereas other researchers argue that specialized kin recognition mechanisms, such as phenotype matching, are widespread in facilitating nepotism.

Because cue-based 'recognition' predominates in social mammals, outcomes are non-deterministic in relation to actual genetic kinship, instead outcomes simply reliably correlate with genetic kinship in an organism's typical conditions. A well-known human example of an inbreeding avoidance mechanism is the Westermarck effect, in which unrelated individuals who happen to spend their childhood in the same household find each other sexually unattractive. Similarly, due to the cue-based mechanisms that mediate social bonding and cooperation, unrelated individuals who grow up together in this way are also likely to demonstrate strong social and emotional ties, and enduring altruism.

== Theoretical background ==
The English evolutionary biologist W. D. Hamilton's theory of inclusive fitness, and the related theory of kin selection, were formalized in the 1960s and 1970s to explain the evolution of social behaviours. Hamilton's early papers, as well as giving a mathematical account of the selection pressure, discussed possible implications and behavioural manifestations. Hamilton considered potential roles of cue-based mechanisms mediating altruism versus 'positive powers' of kin discrimination:

The selective advantage which makes behaviour conditional in the right sense on the discrimination of factors which correlate with the relationship of the individual concerned is therefore obvious. It may be, for instance, that in respect of a certain social action performed towards neighbours indiscriminately, an individual is only just breaking even in terms of inclusive fitness. If he could learn to recognise those of his neighbours who really were close relatives and could devote his beneficial actions to them alone an advantage to inclusive fitness would at once appear. Thus, a mutation causing such discriminatory behaviour itself benefits inclusive fitness and would be selected. In fact, the individual may not need to perform any discrimination so sophisticated as we suggest here; a difference in the generosity of his behaviour according to whether the situations evoking it were encountered near to, or far from, his own home might occasion an advantage of a similar kind." (1996 [1964], 51)

These two possibilities, altruism mediated via 'passive situation' or via 'sophisticated discrimination', stimulated a generation of researchers to look for evidence of any 'sophisticated' kin discrimination. However, Hamilton later (1987) developed his thinking to consider that "an innate kin recognition adaptation" was unlikely to play a role in mediating altruistic behaviours:

But once again, we do not expect anything describable as an innate kin recognition adaptation, used for social behaviour other than mating, for the reasons already given in the hypothetical case of the trees.(Hamilton 1987, 425)

The implication that the inclusive fitness criterion can be met by mediating mechanisms of cooperative behaviour that are context and location-based has been clarified by recent work by West et al.:

In his original papers on inclusive fitness theory, Hamilton pointed out a sufficiently high relatedness to favour altruistic behaviours could accrue in two ways—kin discrimination or limited dispersal (Hamilton, 1964, 1971, 1972, 1975). There is a huge theoretical literature on the possible role of limited dispersal reviewed by Platt & Bever (2009) and West et al. (2002a), as well as experimental evolution tests of these models (Diggle et al., 2007; Griffin et al., 2004; Kümmerli et al., 2009 ). However, despite this, it is still sometimes claimed that kin selection requires kin discrimination (Oates & Wilson, 2001; Silk, 2002 ). Furthermore, a large number of authors appear to have implicitly or explicitly assumed that kin discrimination is the only mechanism by which altruistic behaviours can be directed towards relatives... [T]here is a huge industry of papers reinventing limited dispersal as an explanation for cooperation. The mistakes in these areas seem to stem from the incorrect assumption that kin selection or indirect fitness benefits require kin discrimination (misconception 5), despite the fact that Hamilton pointed out the potential role of limited dispersal in his earliest papers on inclusive fitness theory (Hamilton, 1964; Hamilton, 1971; Hamilton, 1972; Hamilton, 1975). (West et al. 2010, p. 243 and supplement)

For a recent review of the debates around kin recognition and their role in the wider debates about how to interpret inclusive fitness theory, including its compatibility with ethnographic data on human kinship, see Holland (2012).

== Criticism ==
Leading inclusive fitness theorists such as Alan Grafen have argued that the whole research program around kin recognition is somewhat misguided:

Do animals really recognise kin in a way that is different from the way they recognise mates, neighbours, and other organisms and objects? Certainly animals use recognition systems to recognise their offspring, their siblings and their parents. But to the extent that they do so in the same way that they recognise their mates and their neighbours, I feel it is unhelpful to say they have a kin recognition system." (Grafen 1991, 1095)

Others have cast similar doubts over the enterprise:

[T]he fact that animals benefit from engaging in spatially mediated behaviors is not evidence that these animals can recognize their kin, nor does it support the conclusion that spatially based differential behaviors represent a kin recognition mechanism (see also discussions by Blaustein, 1983; Waldman, 1987; Halpin 1991). In other words, from an evolutionary perspective it may well be advantageous for kin to aggregate and for individuals to behave preferentially towards nearby kin, whether or not this behaviour is the result of kin recognition per se" (Tang-Martinez 2001, 25)

== Experimental evidence ==
Kin recognition has been documented in many species of vertebrates and invertebrates. Recent studies have shown that kin recognition can result from a multitude of sensory input. Jill Mateo notes that there are three components prominent in kin recognition. First, "production of unique phenotypic cues or labels". Second, "perception of these labels and the degree of correspondence of these labels with a 'recognition template'", and finally the recognition of the phenotypes should lead to "action taken by the animal as a function of the perceived similarity between its template and an encountered phenotype".

The three components allow for several possible mechanisms of kin recognition. Sensory information gathered from visual, olfactory and auditory stimuli are the most prevalent. The Belding's ground squirrel kin produce similar odors in comparison to non-kin. Mateo notes that the squirrels spent longer investigating non-kin scents suggesting recognition of kin odor. It's also noted that Belding's ground squirrels produce at least two scents arising from dorsal and oral secretions, giving two opportunities for kin recognition. In addition, the Black Rock Skink is also able to use olfactory stimuli as a mechanism of kin recognition. Egernia saxatilis have been found to discriminate kin from non-kin based on scent. Egernia striolata also use some form of scent, most likely through skin secretions. However, Black Rock Skinks discriminate based on familiarity rather than genotypic similarity. Juvenile E. saxatilis can recognize the difference between the scent of adults from their own family group and unrelated adults. Black Rock Skink recognize their family groups based on prior association and not how genetically related the other lizards are to themselves. Auditory distinctions have been noted among avian species. Long-tailed tits (Aegithalos caudatus) are capable of discriminating kin and non-kin based on contact calls. Distinguishing calls are often learned from adults during the nestling period. Studies suggest that the bald-faced hornet, Dolichovespula maculata, can recognize nest mates by their cuticular hydrocarbon profile, which produces a distinct smell.

Some animals can recognize kin by "self-referencing:" comparing the phenotypes of others to themselves. For example, Belding's ground squirrels identify relatives by comparing their own odor and those of littermates with odors of squirrels they encounter. The phenotypes that are used are odors from dorsal and anal glands, and each animal has its own repertoire of odors. If another individual's odor phenotype matches itself closely enough, it is likely a relative. Laboratory tests indicate that females can discriminate between kin and nonkin, close and distant relatives and, within-litters, between full-siblings and maternal half-siblings. Field observations confirm that females cooperate with their closest kin more than with distant kin, and behave aggressively toward nonrelatives. Golden hamsters and bluegill sunfish also can use themselves as referents to discriminate close relatives from distant kin and nonkin.

Kin recognition in some species may also be mediated by immunogenetic similarity of the major histocompatibility complex (MHC). For a discussion of the interaction of these social and biological kin recognition factors see Lieberman, Tooby, and Cosmides (2007). Some have suggested that, as applied to humans, this nature-nurture interactionist perspective allows a synthesis between theories and evidence of social bonding and cooperation across the fields of evolutionary biology, psychology (attachment theory) and cultural anthropology (nurture kinship).

A study has shown that humans are about as genetically equivalent to their friends as they are their fourth cousins.

== In Plants ==
Kin recognition is an adaptive behavior observed in living beings to prevent inbreeding, and increase fitness of populations, individuals and genes. Kin recognition is the key to successful reciprocal altruism, a behavior that increases reproductive success of both organisms involved. Reciprocal altruism as a product of kin recognition has been observed and studied in many animals, and more recently, plants. Due to the nature of plant reproduction and growth, plants are more likely than animals to live in close proximity to family members, and therefore stand to gain more from the ability to differentiate kin from strangers.

In recent years, botanists have been conducting studies to determine which plant species can recognize kin, and discover the responses of plants to neighboring kin. Murphy and Dudley (2009) shows that Impatiens pallida has the ability to recognize individuals closely related to them and those not related to them. The physiological response to this recognition is increasingly interesting. I. pallida responds to kin by increasing branchiness and stem elongation, to prevent shading relatives, and responds to strangers by increasing leaf to root allocation, as a form of competition.

Root allocation has been a very common trait shown through research in plants. Limited amounts of biomass can cause trade-offs among the construction of leaves, stems, and roots overall. But, in plants that recognize kin, the movement of resources in the plant has been shown to be affected by proximity to related individuals. It is well documented that roots can emit volatile compounds in the soil and that interactions also occur below-ground between plant roots and soil organisms. This has mainly focused on organisms in the kingdom Animalia, however.

Regarding this, root systems are known to exchange carbon and defense related molecular signals via connected mycorrhizal networks. For instance, it has been demonstrated that tobacco plants can detect the volatile chemical ethylene in order to form a “shade-avoidance phenotype.” Barley plants were also shown to allocate biomass to their roots when exposed to chemical signals from members of the same species, showing that, if they can recognize those signals for competition, recognition of kin in the plant could be likely via a similar chemical response.

Similarly, Bhatt et al. (2010) show that Cakile edentula, the American sea rocket, has the ability to allocate more energy to root growth, and competition, in response to growing next to a stranger, and allocates less energy to root growth when planted next to a sibling. This reduces competition between siblings and increases fitness of relatives growing next to each other, while still allowing competition between non-relative plants.

Little is known about the mechanisms involved in kin recognition. They most likely vary between species as well as within species. A study by Bierdrzycki et al. (2010) shows that root secretions are necessary for Arabidopsis thaliana to recognize kin vs. strangers, but not necessary to recognize self vs. non-self roots. This study was performed using secretion inhibitors, which disabled the mechanism responsible for kin recognition in this species, and showed similar growth patterns to Bhatt et al., (2010) and Murphy and Dudley (2009) in control groups. The most interesting result of this study was that inhibiting root secretions did not reduce the ability of Arabidopsis to recognize their own roots, which implicates a separate mechanism for self/non-self recognition than that for kin/stranger recognition.

While this mechanism in the roots responds to exudates and involves competition over resources like nitrogen and phosphorus, another mechanism has been recently proposed, which involves competition over light, in which kin recognition takes place in leaves. In their 2014 study, Crepy and Casal conducted multiple experiments on different accessions of A. thaliana. These experiments showed that Arabidopsis accessions have distinct R:FR and blue light signatures, and that these signatures can be detected by photoreceptors, which allows the plant to recognize its neighbor as a relative or non-relative. Not much is known about the pathway that Arabidopsis uses to associate these light patterns with kin, however, researchers ascertained that photoreceptors phyB, cry 1, cry 2, phot1, and phot2 are involved in the process by performing a series of experiments with knock-out mutants. Researchers also concluded that the auxin-synthesis gene TAA1 is involved in the process, downstream of the photoreceptors, by performing a similar experiments using Sav3 knock-out mutants. This mechanism leads to altered leaf direction to prevent shading of related neighbors and to reduce competition for sunlight.

== Inbreeding avoidance ==
When mice inbreed with close relatives in their natural habitat, there is a significant detrimental effect on progeny survival. Since inbreeding can be detrimental, it tends to be avoided by many species. In the house mouse, the major urinary protein (MUP) gene cluster provides a highly polymorphic scent signal of genetic identity that appears to underlie kin recognition and inbreeding avoidance. Thus there are fewer matings between mice sharing MUP haplotypes than would be expected if there were random mating. Another mechanism for avoiding inbreeding is evident when a female house mouse mates with multiple males. In such a case, there appears to be egg-driven sperm selection against sperm from related males.

In toads, male advertisement vocalizations may serve as cues by which females recognize their kin and thus avoid inbreeding.

In dioecious plants, the stigma may receive pollen from several different potential donors. As multiple pollen tubes from the different donors grow through the stigma to reach the ovary, the receiving maternal plant may carry out pollen selection favoring pollen from less related donor plants. Thus, kin recognition at the level of the pollen tube apparently leads to post-pollination selection to avoid inbreeding depression. Also, seeds may be aborted selectively depending on donor–recipient relatedness.

== See also ==
- Attachment theory
- Inclusive fitness
- Kin selection
- Nurture kinship
