= David M. Schneider =

American cultural anthropologist

David Murray Schneider (November 11, 1918, Brooklyn, New York – October 30, 1995, Santa Cruz, California) was an American cultural anthropologist, best known for his studies of kinship and as a major proponent of the symbolic anthropology approach to cultural anthropology.

== Biography ==
He received his B.S. in 1940 and his M.S. from Cornell University in 1941. He received his PhD in Social Anthropology from Harvard in 1949, based on fieldwork on the Micronesian island of Yap.

After completing his graduate work, he first taught at the University of California, Berkeley. In 1960, he accepted a position at the University of Chicago, where he spent most of his career, teaching in Anthropology and the Committee on Human Development. He was Chairman of Anthropology from 1963 to 1966.

While at Chicago, Schneider was director of the Kinship Project, a study supported by the National Science Foundation that looked at how middle-class families in the United States and Great Britain respond to their kinship relations. His findings challenged the common-sense assumption that kinship in Anglo-American cultures is primarily about recognizing biological relatedness. While a rhetoric of "blood" ties is an important conceptual structuring device in US and British kinship systems, cultural and social considerations are more important. The discoveries he demonstrated through a series of books, most famously American Kinship: a Cultural Account, revolutionized and revitalized the study of kinship within anthropology, on the one hand, and contributed to the theoretical basis of feminist anthropology, gender studies, and lesbian and gay studies, on the other.

Schneider critiqued the so-called Western theories of kinship by accusing its supporters of being ethnocentric.

As a teacher, Schneider was also known for taking on and encouraging students studying nontraditional topics, and as a mentor to women and lesbian or gay graduate students, who often otherwise had difficulty finding mentors.

After retiring from Chicago in 1986, he joined the anthropology department at the University of California, Santa Cruz, where he remained until his death in 1995.

== Notable students ==
- Raymond J. DeMallie
- Esther Newton, cultural anthropologist, gay and lesbian communities in U.S.
- Bradd Shore, psychological anthropologist
- Roy Wagner
- Gary Witherspoon

== Select bibliography ==
- A Critique of the Study of Kinship
- American Kinship : A Cultural Account
- Matrilineal Kinship
- Personality in Nature, Society, and Culture
- Dialectics and Gender: Anthropological Approaches
- History of Public Welfare in New York State: 1867–1940
- The Micronesians of Yap and Their Depopulation (1949)
- 1995. Schneider on Schneider: The Conversion of the Jews and Other Anthropological Stories by David Schneider, as told to Richard Handler. Ed. Richard Handler. Durham, N.C.: Duke University Press.
- 1997. "The Power of Culture: Notes on Some Aspects of Gay and Lesbian Kinship in America Today." Cultural Anthropology 12 (2): 270–74.
