= Parallel and cross cousins =

Difference between cousins based on parents' gender

In discussing consanguineal kinship in anthropology, a parallel cousin or ortho-cousin is a cousin from a parent's same-sex sibling, while a cross-cousin is from a parent's opposite-sex sibling. Thus, a parallel cousin is the child of the father's brother (paternal uncle's child) or of the mother's sister (maternal aunt's child), while a cross-cousin is the child of the mother's brother (maternal uncle's child) or of the father's sister (paternal aunt's child). Where there are unilineal descent groups in a society (i.e. matrilineal and/or patrilineal), one's parallel cousins on one or both sides will belong to one's own descent group, while cross-cousins will not (assuming descent group exogamy).

== Role ==
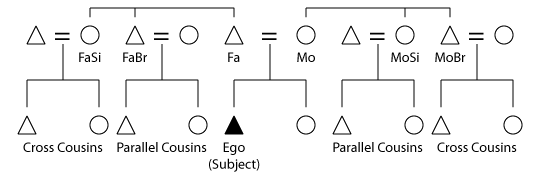
A chart showing family members in relation to a particular Subject (black triangle)

The role of cross-cousins is especially important in some cultures. For example, marriage is promoted between them in the Iroquois system. Parallel cousins are occasionally the subject of promoted marriage, such as the preferential marriage of a male to his father's brother's daughter, common among some pastoral peoples. Such a marriage helps keep property within a lineage. On the other hand, parallel cousin unions in some cultures would fall under an incest taboo, since parallel cousins are part of the subject's unilineage whereas cross-cousins are not.

== Kinship terminologies ==
In many "classificatory" systems of kinship terminology, relatives far beyond genealogical first cousins are referred to using the terms for parallel and cross-cousins. And in many societies, parallel cousins (but not cross-cousins) are also referred to by the same terms that are used for siblings. For instance, it is characteristic of the "Iroquois" system of kinship terminology, its variants the "Crow" and "Omaha", and most Australian Aboriginal systems, that a male parallel cousin is referred to as "brother", and a female parallel cousin is "sister". In an Iroquois type of terminology, if the terms used to refer to cross-cousins are assimilated to those for other relatives, it is generally in-laws (since marriage with cross-cousins is often preferentially favored), so that the terms for "male cross-cousin" and "brother-in-law" are the same, as are the terms for "female cross-cousin" and "sister-in-law".

The remaining types of kinship terminology (the "Hawaiian", "Eskimo" and "Sudanese") do not group parallel cousins together in opposition to cross-cousins.

== Taboos ==
John Maynard Smith, in The Evolution of Sex (1978), notes that Richard D. Alexander suggested that uncertainty regarding paternity may help account for the intermarriage taboo on parallel, but not on cross-cousins. Fathers who are also brothers may overtly or covertly share sexual relations with the wife of one or the other, raising the possibility that apparent parallel cousins are in fact half-siblings, sired by the same father. Likewise, mothers who are also sisters may overtly or covertly share sexual access to the husband of one or the other, raising the possibility that apparent parallel cousins are in fact half-siblings, sired by the same father. Note that there is no possibility of any classificatory cousins sharing the same mother. Because maternal identity is (almost) never in question, they would be automatically classified as siblings. Only mistaken paternity leads to such errors.

This possibility is much less likely for cross-cousins, because in the absence of full-sibling incest, it is unlikely that cross-cousins can share a father by overt or covert sexual relationships. It would only be possible if a subject's mother had a brother whose wife was impregnated by the subject's father, thereby allowing apparent cross-cousins to be covert half-siblings, sharing the same father.

=== Middle Eastern parallel cousin marriage ===
Andrey Korotayev claimed that Islamization was a strong and significant predictor of parallel cousin (father's brother's daughter – FBD) marriage. He has shown that while there is a clear functional connection between Islam and FBD marriage, the prescription to marry one's FBD does not appear to be sufficient to persuade people to marry thus, even if the marriage brings with it economic advantages. According to Korotayev, a systematic acceptance of parallel cousin marriage took place when Islamization occurred together with Arabization.

== See also ==
- Kinship and descent
- Family
- Genealogy
- Cultural anthropology
- Cousin marriage
- List of coupled cousins
- Mahram
