= Inuit kinship =

Type of kinship system

Inuit kinship (formerly Eskimo kinship; also called lineal kinship) is a category of kinship used to define family organization in anthropology. Identified by Lewis H. Morgan in his 1871 work Systems of Consanguinity and Affinity of the Human Family, the Inuit system was one of six major kinship systems (Inuit, Hawaiian, Iroquois, Crow, Omaha, and Sudanese). The system of English-language kinship terms falls into the Inuit type.

== Joint family ==
The joint family system places no distinction between patrilineal and matrilineal relatives; instead, it focuses on differences in kinship distance (the closer the relative is, the more distinctions are made). The system emphasizes the nuclear family, identifying directly only the mother, father, brother, and sister. All other relatives are grouped together into categories. It uses both classificatory and descriptive terms, differentiating between gender, generation, lineal relatives (relatives in the direct line of descent), and collateral relatives (blood relatives not in the direct line of descent). The Inuit system is defined by its "cognatic" or "bilateral" emphasis - no distinction is made between patrilineal and matrilineal relatives.

Parental siblings are distinguished only by their sex (aunt, uncle). All children of these individuals are lumped together regardless of sex (cousins). Unlike the Hawaiian system, Ego's parents are clearly distinguished from their siblings.

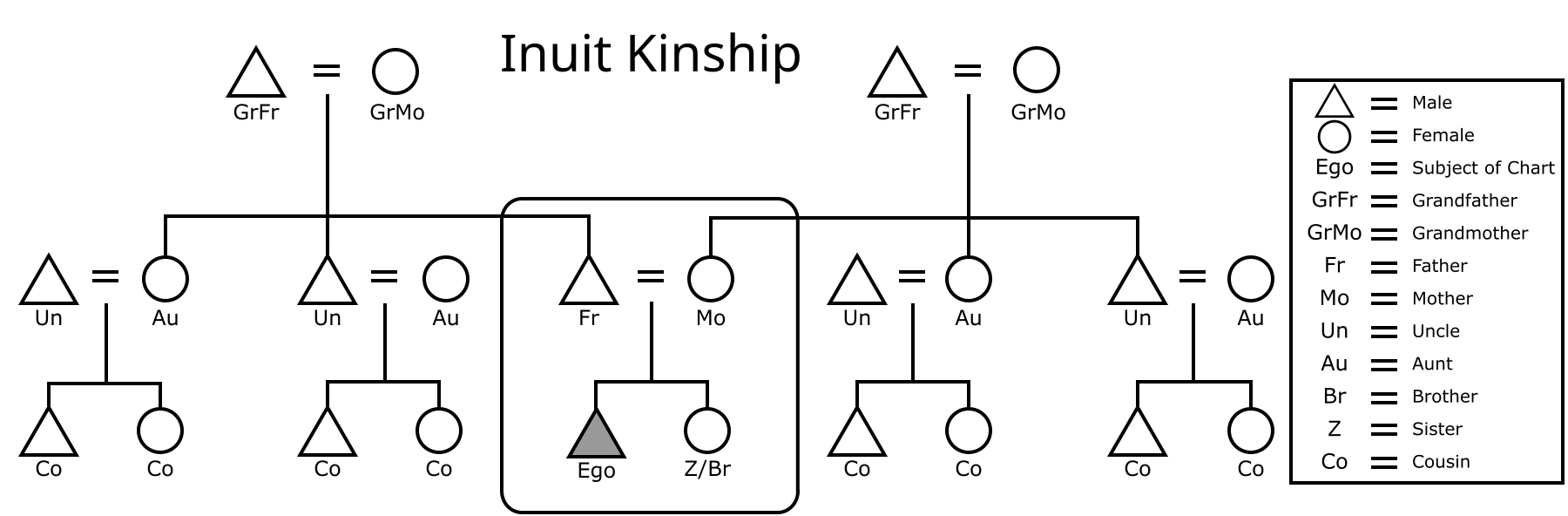
Graphic of the Inuit kinship system

== Usage ==
The Inuit system is common among the world's kinship systems and is at present used in most Western societies (such as those of modern-day Europe or North America) as well as modern East Asian societies. In addition, it is found among a small number of food-foraging peoples such as the ǃKung tribe of Africa and the Inuit (Inuit-Yupik) for whom it is named.

The system is widely used in non-unilineal societies, where the dominant relatives are the immediate family. In most Western societies, the nuclear family represents an independent social and economic group, which has caused the emphasis on the immediate kinship. The tendency of families in Western societies to live apart also reinforces this.

== Terminology ==
The term Eskimo is considered pejorative in Canada, and has been replaced there by the term Inuit. The former remains in use in Alaska, though less so than in past decades, because the term includes both Inuit and non-Inuit Native Alaskans. In Canada, the term Inuit kinship is therefore widely used instead of Eskimo kinship.

== See also ==
- Kinship terminology
