= Kinship analysis =

Kinship analysis is any analysis that deals with kinship. Such analyses are used in many different disciplines of research, where analysis is conducted in different ways.

- In anthropology, kinship analysis is normally either the analysis of social practices related to kinship, or the analysis of systems of kinship terminology in different cultures.
- In forensics, kinship analysis is used about forms of genetic profiling aimed at discovering possible genealogical relations between individuals based on DNA samples.
