= Kinship terminology =

Words and phrases to describe familial relationships

Kinship terminology is the system used in languages to refer to the persons to whom an individual is related through kinship. Different societies classify kinship relations differently and therefore use different systems of kinship terminology; for example, some languages distinguish between consanguine and affinal uncles (i.e. the brothers of one's parents and the husbands of the sisters of one's parents, respectively), whereas others have only one word to refer to both a father and his brothers. Kinship terminologies include the terms of address used in different languages or communities for different relatives and the terms of reference used to identify the relationship of these relatives to ego or to each other.

== Historical view ==
Anthropologist Lewis Henry Morgan (1818–1881) performed the first survey of kinship terminologies in use around the world. Though much of his work is now considered dated, he argued that kinship terminologies reflect different sets of distinctions. For example, most kinship terminologies distinguish between sexes (the difference between a brother and a sister) and between generations (the difference between a child and a parent). Moreover, he argued, kinship terminologies distinguish between relatives by blood and marriage (although recently some anthropologists have argued that many societies define kinship in terms other than blood).

However, Morgan also observed that different languages (and, by extension, societies) organize these distinctions differently. He proposed to describe kinship terms and terminologies as either descriptive or classificatory. When a descriptive term is used, it can only represent one type of relationship between two people, while a classificatory term represents one of many different types of relationships. For example, the word brother in English-speaking societies indicates a son of the same parent; thus, English-speaking societies use the word brother as a descriptive term. A person's male first cousin could be the mother's brother's son, mother's sister's son, father's brother's son, father's sister's son, and so on; English-speaking societies therefore use the word cousin as a classificatory term.

Morgan discovered that a descriptive term in one society can become a classificatory term in another society. For example, in some societies, one would refer to many different people as "mother" (the woman who gave birth to oneself, as well as her sister and husband's sister, and also one's father's sister). Moreover, some societies do not group together relatives which the English-speaking societies classify together. For example, some languages have no one-word equivalent to cousin, because different terms refer to one's mother's sister's children and to one's father's sister's children.

=== Six basic patterns of kinship ===
Using these different terms, Murdock identified six basic patterns of kinship terminologies:

Charts of the six systems.

The diagram depicts a two-generation comparison of the six major kinship systems. Circles correspond to female relatives while triangles correspond to male ones. Relatives marked with the same non-gray color are called by the same kinship term (apart from sex-differentiation in the sibling/cousin generation, except where this becomes structurally-relevant under the Crow and Omaha systems).

Note that in some versions of the Crow and Omaha systems, the relatives shown as "cousin" in the Crow and Omaha boxes of the chart are actually referred to as either "son/daughter" or "nephew/niece" (different terms are used by male ego vs. female ego).

Also, in some languages with an Iroquois type of system, the relatives shown as "cousin" on the chart are referred to by the same terms used for "sister-in-law"/"brother-in-law" (since such cross-cousins — including remote classificatory cross-cousins — are preferred marriage partners). Similarly, the term for father's sister can be the same as that for mother-in-law, and the term for mother's brother the same as father-in-law.

==== Hawaiian kinship ====
- Hawaiian kinship: the most classificatory; only distinguishes between sex and generation. Thus, siblings and cousins are not distinguished (the same terms are used for both types of relatives).

==== Sudanese kinship ====
- Sudanese kinship: the most descriptive; no two types of relatives share the same term. Siblings are distinguished from cousins, and different terms are used for each type of cousin (i.e. father's brother's children, father's sister's children, mother's sister's children and mother's brother's children).

==== Inuit kinship ====
- Inuit kinship: has both classificatory and descriptive terms; in addition to sex and generation, it also distinguishes between lineal relatives (those related directly by a line of descent) and collateral relatives (those related by blood, but not directly in the line of descent). Lineal relatives have highly descriptive terms; collateral relatives have highly classificatory terms. Thus, siblings are distinguished from cousins, while all types of cousins are grouped together. The system of English language kinship terms falls into the Inuit type.

==== Iroquois kinship and its variations ====
- Iroquois kinship: has both classificatory and descriptive terms; in addition to sex and generation, it also distinguishes between siblings of opposite sexes in the parental generation. A genealogical relationship traced through a pair of siblings of the same sex is classed as a blood relationship, but one traced though a pair of siblings of the opposite sex can be considered an in-law relationship. In other words, siblings are grouped together with parallel cousins, while separate terms are used for cross-cousins. Also, one calls one's mother's sister "mother" and one's father's brother "father". However, one refers to one's mother's brother and one's father's sister by separate terms (often the terms for father-in-law and mother-in-law, since cross-cousins can be preferential marriage partners).

The basic principles of Crow and Omaha terminologies are symmetrical and opposite, with Crow systems having a matrilineal emphasis and Omaha systems a patrilineal emphasis.

==== Crow kinship ====
- Crow kinship: like Iroquois, but further distinguishes between one's mother's side and one's father's side. Relatives on the mother's side of the family have more descriptive terms, and relatives on the father's side have more classificatory terms. Thus, Crow kinship is like Iroquois kinship, with the addition that a number of relatives belonging to one's father's matrilineage are grouped together, ignoring generational differences, so that the same term is used for both one's father's sister and one's father's sister's daughter, etc.

==== Omaha kinship ====
- Omaha kinship: like Iroquois, but further distinguishes between one's mother's side and one's father's side. Relatives on the mother's side of the family have more classificatory terms, and relatives on the father's side have more descriptive terms. Thus, Omaha kinship is like Iroquois, with the addition that a number of relatives belonging to one's mother's patrilineage are grouped together, ignoring generational differences, so that the same term is used for both one's mother's brother and one's mother's brother's son, etc.

== Tri-relational kin-terms ==
A unique set of kin-terms common in some Australian Aboriginal languages are tri-relational—also called triangular, ternary, triadic and shared kin-terms—which encapsulate a set of relations between three distinct entities. Broadly, there are two kinds of tri-relational kin-terms. The more common is a Dual Propositus Tri-relational Kin-term which has one referent whose relationship is defined with respect to two anchor points (propositi) and from which the relation between the two propositi can be inferred. The less common are Tri-relational Dyadic Terms which reference a pair of related entities which (i.e., this dyad) is in some way to single propositus.

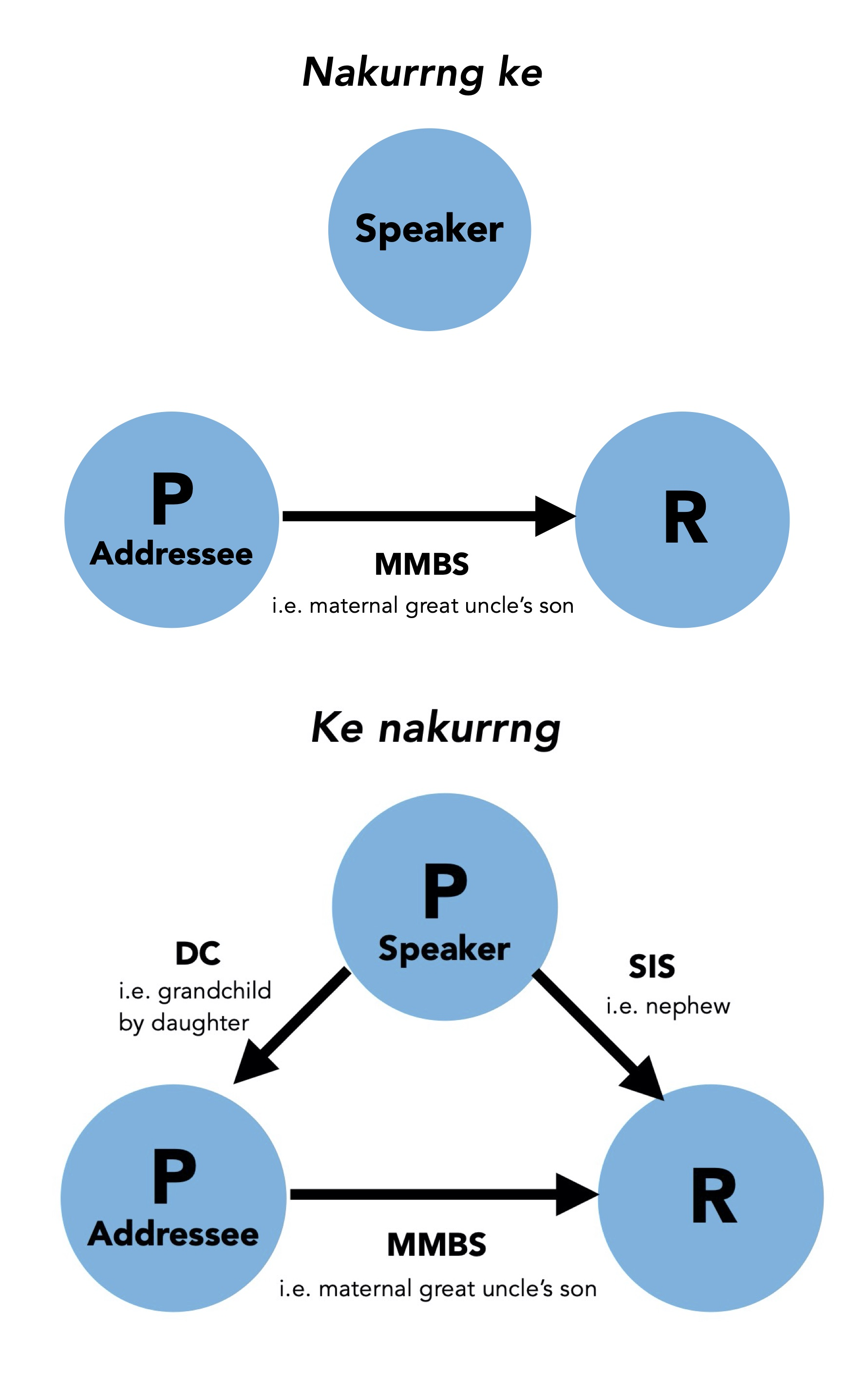
The Bi-relational and Tri-relational meanings of the word nakurrng in Bininj Kunwok

Dual Propositus Tri-relational Kin-terms

Terms of this type can be found in Murrinh-patha and Bininj Kunwok. The speaker and the addressee form two distinct propositi (P) who have unique relations to the referent (R). An example in Murrinh-patha is the term yilamarna. This term refers to the speaker's brother, who is also the uncle of the addressee; it is therefore also encoded in this term that the addressee is the child of the speaker. The term could be elaborated thus:

- The person (R) who is my (PSpeaker) brother who is your (PAddressee) uncle by virtue of you being my child.

In Bininj Kunwok, the kin-term nakurrng can be either a regular (i.e. bi-relational) or tri-relational kin-term depending on the context. In the case in the illustration, the difference marked by the position of the possessive pronoun ke which either marks the addressee as the sole propositus or allows for a tri-relational interpretation:

- The person (R) who is your (PAddressee) maternal uncle and who is my (PSpeaker) nephew by virtue of you being my grandchild.

Tri-relational Dyadic Terms

In this kind of tri-relation, two referents (R1,R2) form a dyad via some relation (commonly marriage), and this dyad is in turn related to the speaker (the propositus) in some way. An example of a tri-relational dyadic term can be found in Gooniyandi. Marralangi one way of referring to a husband and wife pair is specific to when either the husband or the wife is the opposite-sex sibling of the speaker. The denotation of marralangi is thus:

- Those two (R1,R2) who are a married couple wherein the husband (R1) is my (female, PSpeaker) brother.

== Group/dyadic kin terms and pronouns ==
=== Dyadic Kin-terms ===
Australian Aboriginal languages tend to have extensive vocabularies for denoting kin-relations, including for referring to and addressing dyads and groups based on their relation to one another or to the speaker. For example, see below the complete inventory of group kin-terms in Bardi (some but not all of these are assessed with respect to the speaker as well and may thus be considered tri-relational dyadic terms:

Bardi Dyadic Kin-terms
Term	English Equivalent	Kin Denoted
aalabo	men’s and women’s children	mC + wC
aalagalag	group of children with their father	mC + F
aalamalarr	man’s wife and his children	W + mC
alabal	brothers and sisters-in-law	HZ + WB etc
jaalbola	cousins and brothers	FZC + B (etc)
birriigaarra	mother and her brother	M + MB (+MZ)
birriirrmoorroo	‘aunties’	M + FZ
irrmoorrgooloo	father and his sister	F + FZ
birriibo	mother and her children	M + wC
oombarnborla	same generation ‘brothers’	B + B, FBS + FBS, etc
marrirborla	same generation ‘sisters’	Z + Z
irrmoorrgool	father with his siblings	F + FB + FZ
gaarragooloo	uncles	F + MB
goligamarda	grandmothers	FM + MM
galoogaloongoordoo	grandfathers	FF + FF
jamoogamarda	grandparents	MF + MM
nyamigamarda	grandparents	MF + MM
gamardajamoo	grandparents	MM + MF
injalala	cross cousins	MBS + MBD, FZS + FSD (etc)
galoongoordinyarr	grandparents and grandchildren	FF + FFB + FFZ (etc), FF + SC (etc)
golinyarr	grandmother and grandchildren	FM + MFZ + FMB (etc); FM + SC (etc)
jamoonyarr	grandmother and grandchildren	MF + MFB (etc); MF + DC (etc)
gamardanyarr	grandmother with her grandchildren	MM + DC
aloorambarr	wife’s parents and their daughter-in-law	WM + WMB
oorambarr		WMB + WMBB
anymanoonoo	mothers-in-law	DHM + SWM
orangan	in-laws	HM + SW
oomarloomarl(a)	man with wife’s brothers	ZH + WB

The size of this dyadic kin-term inventory is not atypical of Australian languages. Though smaller, the Dyirbal dyadic kin-term inventory is also extensive (e and y stand for elder and younger):

Dyirbal Dyadic Kin-terms
Term	Kin Denoted
gumbu-jirr	MM+DC
ngagi-jirr	MF+DC
babi-jirr	FM+SC
bulu-jirr	FF+SC
ngumay-girr	F+C FyB+eBC FyZ+eBC
gina-girr	M+C MyC+eZC MeZ+yZC MeB+yZC
ngalman-girr	B+Z B+B Z+Z
ngaybirr / mulba	H+W
dadiny-garra	WB+ZH HZ+BW etc.
dunggarr-jirr	MeBD+FyZD/S MeBS+FyZD/S

In Murrinh-patha, nonsingular pronouns are differentiated not only by the gender makeup of the group, but also by the members' interrelation. If the members are in a sibling-like relation, a third pronoun (SIB) will be chosen distinct from the Masculine (MASC) and Feminine/Neuter (FEM).

== Relative age ==
Some languages, such as Kannada, Telugu, Tamil, Malayalam, Turkish, Sinhalese, Chinese (see Chinese kinship), Japanese, Korean, Khmer, Mongolian, Vietnamese, Tagalog (Filipino), Hungarian, Bulgarian, Nepalese, Navajo and Nahuatl add another dimension to some relations: relative age. Rather than one term for "brother", there exist, for example, different words for "older brother" and "younger brother". In Tamil, an older male sibling is referred to as aṇṇā and a younger male sibling as thambi, whereas older and younger female siblings are called akkā and thangai respectively. Languages which distinguish relative age may not have non-age relative kinship terms at all. In Vietnamese, all younger siblings are referred to with the ungendered term em, whereas older siblings are distinguished by sex: anh for males and chị for females.

== Identification of alternating generations ==
Other languages, such as Chiricahua, use the same terms of address for alternating generations. So Chiricahua children (male or female) call their paternal grandmother -ch’iné, and likewise this grandmother will call her son's children -ch’iné. Similar features are seen also in Huichol, some descendant languages of Proto-Austronesian (e.g. Fordata, Kei, and Yamdena), Bislama, and Usarufa. Terms that recognize alternating generations and the prohibition of marriage within one's own set of alternate generation relatives (0, ±2, ±4, etc.) are common in Australian Aboriginal kinship.

The relative age and alternating-generations systems are combined in some languages. For instance, Tagalog borrows the relative age system of the Chinese kinship and follows the generation system of kinship. Philippine kinship distinguishes between generation, age and in some cases, gender.

== Dravidian ==
Floyd Lounsbury described a possible seventh, Dravidian, type of terminological system; there is on-going discussion on whether this system is a sub-type of Iroquois or whether it is a distinct system that had been conflated with Iroquois in Morgan’s typology of kin-term systems. Both systems distinguish relatives by marriage from relatives by descent, although both are classificatory categories rather than being based on biological descent. The basic idea is that of applying an even/odd distinction to relatives that takes into account the gender of every linking relative for ego’s kin relation to any given person. A MFBD(C), for example, is a mother’s father’s brother’s daughter’s child. If each female link (M,D) is assigned a 0 and each male (F,B) a 1, the number of 1s is either even or odd; in this case, even. However, variant criteria exist. In a Dravidian system with a patrilineal modulo-2 counting system, marriage is prohibited with this relative, and a marriageable relative must be modulo-2 odd. There exists also a version of this logic with a matrilineal bias. Discoveries of systems that use modulo-2 logic, as in South Asia, Australia, and many other parts of the world, marked a major advance in the understanding of kinship terminologies that differ from kin relations and terminologies employed by Europeans.

The Dravidian kinship system involves selective cousinhood. One's father's brother's children and one's mother's sister's children are not cousins but brothers and sisters one step removed. They are considered consanguineous (pangali in Tamil), and marriage with them is strictly forbidden as incestuous. However, one's father's sister's children and one's mother's brother's children are considered cousins and potential mates (muraicherugu in Tamil). Marriages between such cousins are allowed and encouraged. There is a clear distinction between cross cousins, who are one's true cousins and parallel cousins, who are, in fact, siblings.

Like Iroquois people, Dravidians use the same words to refer to their father's sister and mother-in-law (atthai in Tamil, atthe in Kannada, and attha or atthayya in Telugu) and their mother's brother and father-in-law (maamaa in Tamil, maava in Kannada, and maavayya in Telugu). In Kannada, distinction between these relationships may be made because sodara is added before atthe and maava to specifically refer to one's father's sister and mother's brother respectively, although this term is not used in direct address. In Tamil, however, only one's mother's brother is captioned with thaai before maamaa because of the honor accorded this relationship.

== Abbreviations for genealogical relationships ==
The genealogical terminology used in many genealogical charts describes relatives of the subject in question. Using the abbreviations below, genealogical relationships may be distinguished by single or compound relationships, such as BC for a brother's children, MBD for a mother's brother's daughter, and so forth.

- B = Brother
- Z = Sister
- SI = Sibling
- S = Son
- D = Daughter
- C = Child
- F = Father
- M = Mother
- P = Parent
- H = Husband
- W = Wife
- SP = Spouse
- GC = Grandchild
- GP = Grandparent
- LA = In-law
- (m.s.) = male speaking
- (f.s.) = female speaking

== See also ==
- Cognatic kinship
- Cousin
- Dyadic kinship term
- Family
- Fictive kinship
- Genealogical numbering systems
- Irish kinship
- Marriage
- Numerical variation in kinship terms
