= Omaha kinship =

Native American kinship system

Omaha kinship is the system of terms and relationships used to define family in Omaha tribal culture. Identified by Lewis Henry Morgan in his 1871 work Systems of Consanguinity and Affinity of the Human Family, the Omaha system is one of the six major kinship systems (Inuit, Hawaiian, Iroquois, Crow, Omaha, and Sudanese) which he identified internationally.

== Kinship system ==
In function, the system is extremely similar to the Crow system. But, whereas Crow groups are matrilineal, Omaha descent groups are characteristically patrilineal.

In this system, relatives are sorted according to their descent and their gender. Ego's father and his brothers are merged and addressed by a single term, and a similar pattern is seen for Ego's mother and her sisters. (Marriages take place among people of different gentes or clans in the tribe.)

Like most other kinship systems, Omaha kinship distinguishes between parallel and cross-cousins. While parallel cousins are merged by term and addressed the same as Ego's siblings, cross-cousins are differentiated by generational divisions. On the maternal side, cross-cousins are raised a generation (making them Ego's Mother's Brother and Ego's Mother), while those on the paternal side are lowered a generation (making them the generational equivalent of Ego's Children).

The system is similar to that of Iroquois kinship. It uses bifurcate merging, but only the Iroquois system uses bifurcate merging as a label. In addition, Iroquois kinship is a matrilineal system.

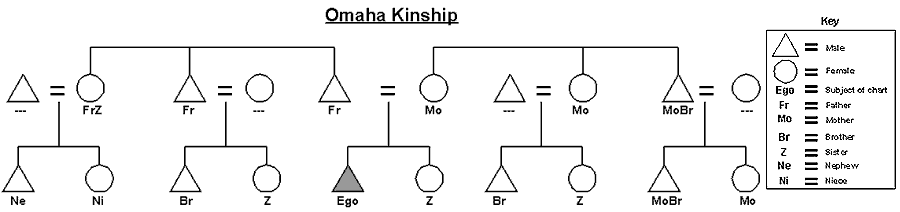
Graphic of the Omaha kinship system

== Usage ==
The system is named for the Omaha, a Native American tribe historically located on the Northern Plains in present-day Nebraska. The Omaha system has been found among some indigenous groups of Mexico, the Mapuche people of Chile and Argentina, the Dani tribe of New Guinea, the Shona of Zimbabwe, the Igbo of Nigeria and is proposed to be reconstructed for Indo-European kinship.

== See also ==
- Family
- Kinship and descent
- Anthropology
- List of anthropologists

== Sources and external links ==
- William Haviland, Cultural Anthropology, Wadsworth Publishing, 2002. ISBN 0-534-27479-X
- The nature of kinship
