= Iroquois kinship =

Indigenous kinship system

Iroquois kinship (also known as bifurcate merging kinship) is a kinship system named after the Haudenosaunee (Iroquois) people whose kinship system was the first one described to use this particular type of system. Identified by Lewis Henry Morgan in his 1871 work Systems of Consanguinity and Affinity of the Human Family, the Iroquois system is one of the six major kinship systems (Inuit, Hawaiian, Iroquois, Crow, Omaha, and Sudanese).

== Kinship system ==
The system has both classificatory and descriptive terms. In addition to gender and generation, Iroquois kinship also distinguishes 'same-sex' and 'cross-sex' parental siblings: the brothers of Ego's (the subject from whose perspective the kinship is based) father, and the sisters of Ego's mother, are referred to by the same parental kinship terms used for Ego's Father and Mother. The sisters of Ego's father, and the brothers of Ego's mother, on the other hand, are referred to by non-parental kinship terms, commonly translated into English as "Aunt" and "Uncle".

The children of one's parents' same-sex siblings, i.e., parallel cousins, are referred to by sibling kinship terms. The children of Aunts or Uncles, i.e. cross cousins, are not considered siblings, and are referred to by kinship terms commonly translated into English as "cousin". In some systems, the kinship terms applied to cross-cousins are the same as those applied to brothers-in-law and sisters-in-law, due to preferential marriage practices (see below).

Egocentric genealogical diagram of the Iroquois kinship system.

== Marriage ==
Ego (the subject from whose perspective the kinship is based) is encouraged to marry his cross-cousins but discouraged or prohibited from marrying his parallel cousins. In many societies with Iroquois kinship terminologies, the preferred marriage partners include not only first cousins (mother's brother's children and father's sister's children), but more remote relatives who are also classified as cross-cousins by the logic of the kinship system. Preferential cross-cousin marriage can be useful in reaffirming alliances between unilineal lineages or clans.

== Usage ==
The term Iroquois comes from the Haudenosaunee Confederacy or "Iroquois", originally five and later six Indigenous peoples of the Northeastern Woodlands. Another aspect of their kinship was that the six nations all had matrilineal systems, in which children were born into the mother's clan and gained status through it. Women controlled some property, and hereditary leadership passed through the maternal line. A woman's eldest brother was more important as a mentor to her children than their father, who was always of a different clan.

"Iroquois tradition had the lineage of the clan or tribe traced through the mother's side. However, the amount of power women held in the tribe decreased with time due to the American revolution." (Lappas, Thomas).

Some groups in other countries also happen to be independently organized for kinship by the Iroquois system. It is commonly found in unilineal descent groups. These include:

1. The Anishinaabe of North America, who include the Algonquin, Ojibwe (including Nipissing, Mississauga, and Saulteaux), Odawa, Potawatomi, and Anisininew peoples. Many of these people were traditional neighbors to the Haudenosaunee, but they spoke languages of the Algonquian family.

Other populations found to have the Iroquois system are

1. Most of the Bantu-speaking cultures of Eastern and Southern sub-Saharan Africa — see Sesotho kinship for an example.
2. Many Melanesian societies.

=== South India and Sri Lanka ===
Some communities in South India use the kinship tradition described above.

=== Melanesia ===
Many of the cultures of Vanuatu use this type of kinship system. In Bislama (Vanuatu pidgin), paternal uncles and maternal aunts are referred to as smol papa "small father" and smol mama "small mother" respectively.

== See also ==
- Family
- Kinship and descent
- Marriage
- Cultural anthropology
- Anthropology
- List of anthropologists
