= Sesotho kinship =

Kinship system

Sesotho – the language of the Basotho ethnic group of South Africa and Lesotho – has a complex system of kinship terms which may be classified to fall under the Iroquois kinship pattern. The complex terminology rules are necessitated in part by the traditional promotion of certain forms of cousin marriage among the Bantu peoples of sub-Saharan Africa. Most of the terms used have common reconstructed Proto-Bantu roots.

Due to the importance of family, the terms are limited to relatives through birth (consanguinity) and marriage (affinity). Adoption – the modern legal variety or the older common-law/traditional variety – is no different from birth. Marriage is not distinguished from birth, except for the names of sons- and daughters-in-law, and the terminology treats relatives through marriage to be no different from relatives through birth.

The adoption of an Iroquois kinship system is necessitated by the fact that traditionally large families lived together in compounds, and married children rarely lived far from their parents. Thus, the nuclear family is far larger and comprises far more categories than the father-mother-children pattern which is common in modern European culture.

== Generations ==
Iroquois systems make the most terminology distinctions in the generation of the "ego" (oneself) – one's siblings and cousins – and this generation's parents (mother/father and aunts/uncles) and immediate offspring (children and nephews/nieces). These are the generations directly involved in cousin marriage, and the seemingly complicated terminology shows a certain symmetry when one considers the difference between cross-cousins and parallel cousins.

Above these three strata, all relatives are grandparents, and below all strata are grandchildren – even in the face of a lack of direct ancestry or descent.

== Ego's parents generation ==
In Iroquois kinship systems, the complexity stems from promotion and/or prohibition of certain forms of cousin marriage, resulting in a form of symmetry called bifurcate merging where the parents of one's cross-cousins have a set of names different from the parents of one's parallel cousins.

Ones mother's female relatives of the same generation are considered one's mothers, and one's father's male relatives of the same generation are considered one's fathers. Moreover, one cannot marry their fathers' or mothers' children (siblings and parallel cousins), but is allowed/encouraged to marry every other relative of the same generation (cross-cousins). Additionally, the names of these relatives' spouses are dependent upon the names of the relatives, resulting in the seemingly nonsensical (to speakers of other Bantu languages) situation where the inherently gender-dependent terms rakgadi and malome are unisex when used for one's relatives' spouses.

The Sesotho system displays a slight bit more complexity than the standard Iroquois systems in that, when it comes to one's mothers and fathers, the terminology further classes them based on relative age to one's biological parents.

In the chart below, vertical placement signifies relative age, with relatives above one's biological parents being older than one's parents, and vice versa.

Kinship chart

Rakgadi♂
Nkgono♀
Rakgadi♂
Mmangwane♀

Rakgadi♀	Nkgono♀
Ntatemoholo♂	Malome♂
Ntate♂	Mme♀
Nna
Rakgadi♀	Mmangwane♀
Rangwane♂	Malome♂

Ntatemoholo♂
Malome♀
Rangwane♂
Malome♀

class="wikitable"

Relationship	Name	Explanation
Ego	Nna
Mother	Mme
Father	Ntate
Mother's brother	Malome	Ma- prefix ("mother") plus Proto-Bantu suffix *-dúme indicating masculinity; literally "male mother"
Mother's older sister	Nkgono	The same word as "grandmother", signifying "old mother"
Mother's younger sister	Mmangwane	Mma ("mother") plus diminutive suffix; literally "small mother"
Father's sister	Rakgadi	Ra- prefix ("father") plus Proto-Bantu suffix *-kádî́ indicating femininity; literally "female father"
Father's older brother	Ntatemoholo	The same word as "grandfather", signifying "old father"
Father's younger brother	Rangwane	Ra- ("father") plus diminutive suffix; literally "small father"

== Ego's generation ==
The most complexity is displayed in the terms used by one to refer to male and female relatives in one's own generation. Immediate siblings and parallel cousins have similar terms, while cross-cousins all have a single name motswala derived from the verb -tswala ("give birth"), denoting the fact that cross-cousin marriage is encouraged.

Ego's generation

Rangwane/ Ntatemoholo♂	Rakgadi♀	Ntate		Mme	Malome♂	Mmangwane/ Nkgono♀
(sibling)	Motswala		(sibling)	Nna	Motswala	(sibling)

Notes:

The words used by ego when referring to his/her siblings depend on ego's gender, the relative age of ego's sibling, and whether ego is talking about their sibling (nominative) or to their sibling (vocative).

Nominative names
		Sibling's gender	
		Female	Male
Sibling's relative age	Older	Ausi	Abuti/Moholwane
Sibling's relative age	Younger	Nnake	Moena

When speaking to the sibling directly, the names in the table above are used, but when directly speaking to a sibling younger than oneself it is more usual to use their name directly without a title prefix.
Additionally, the name kgaitsedi may be used when speaking about/to a younger sibling of the opposite gender.

== Ego's children's generation ==
For the generation directly below that of the ego, the names one uses for the children of one's siblings, cross-cousins, and parallel cousins are simply determined by whether or not one has the same gender as the relative on the same generation, who is the child's parent. In particular, all children who are related to the ego by a parent of the same gender as the ego are referred to as one's children, whereas everyone else from this generation is referred to by the generic term motjhana. Equivalently, if a child refers to ego as rakgadi or malome, then ego refers to the child as motjhana.

If ego has married their motswala or even "sibling", then that relation's children – who are also ego's biological children – will simply be given the same name as ego's children without further complication.

Ego's children's generation

Nna		(same gender relative)		(opposite gender relative)
Moradi♀	Mora♂	Moradi♀	Mora♂	Motjhana

Notes:

The names used for ego's children are mora and moradi, depending on the child's gender.

In summary, ego can marry a relative only if ego's parents call that relative motjhana. This bars marriage to parallel cousins as well as relatives in generations above and below oneself.

== Remaining generations ==
Regardless of direct descent or ancestry, all relatives in generations above ego's parents are called nkgono and ntatemoholo for females and males respectively, and all relatives below ego's children are called setloholo. If the specific generation of one's grandchildren is important, then it can be marked by successively applying diminutive suffixes to the word setloholo, giving

- setloholo – grandchild
- setloholwana – great-grandchild
- setloho-tloholwana – great-great-grandchild
- setloho-tloho-tloholwana – great-great-grandchild
- etc.

== Ego's spouse and in-laws ==
In the vocative, relations through marriage are not distinguished from relations through birth/adoption. However, to avoid ambiguity, in the nominative there exist special terms for parents-in-law and children-in-law. It is worth noting that the terms for a female ego's parents-in-law literally mean "my (parallel) cousin's mother" and "my (parallel) cousin's father", even if one did not marry their cousin; this a relic of the traditional encouragement of parallel cousin marriage.

Family of Sesotho kinship

(mother-in-law)♀	(father-in-law)♂
Nna	(spouse)
Mokgwenyana♂	Moradi♀	Mora♂	Ngwetsi♀

Notes:

A male calls simply calls his parents-in-law "mother " and "father", but in the nominative a woman may call her in-laws by the gender-neutral term matsale.

The generic term for a spouse is mohatsa. More specifically, in the nominative a husband is monna and wife is mosadi (generic terms for "man" and "woman", respectively). In the vocative, ntate and mme are used or – less formerly – the generic mohats'aka ("my spouse") is used.

Mokgwenyana and ngwetsi are used to refer to the son- and daughter-in-law respectively, when the more generic terms moradi and mora are not being used.
