= Irish kinship =

Irish kinship is a system of kinship terminology (descended from the original Celtic practices) which shows a bifurcate collateral pattern. This system is used by a minority of people living in the Gaeltacht regions of Ireland. Irish kinship terminology varies from English kinship as it focuses on gender and generation, with less emphasis on differentiating lineal vs. collateral.

== Terminology ==
Irish kinship is limited to a small number of words of Gaelic origin used in identifying relatives:

- Máthair ('mother')
- Athair ('father')
- Mac ('son')
- Iníon ('daughter')
- Deartháir ('brother')
- Deirfiúr ('sister')
- Aintín ('aunt')
- Uncail ('uncle')
- Nia ('nephew')
- Neacht ('niece')
- Seanmháthair ('grandmother')
- Seanathair ('grandfather')
- Garmhac ('grandson')
- Gariníon ('granddaughter')
- Col Ceathar ('cousin')

== Use of terminology ==
A majority of the terms used in the kinship system are similar to the English kinship system, but the terms for aunt, uncle, nephew, niece and cousin have a far vaguer and different use. These terms, however, vary in degree of use as this system is largely confined to the Gaeltacht regions, and hence not widely used among other members of Irish society. The system has, however, been previously taught in primary schools around the country, including in non-Gaeltacht areas.

=== Aintín and Uncail, Nia and Neacht ===
Aintín is the word for "aunt" and uncail for "uncle" but in the Irish kinship system aunt and uncle have a wider definition; in common kinship an aunt or uncle is the sister or brother of either the mother or the father. However, in Irish kinship, Aintín and Uncail are used for not only the siblings of the parents, but as well for any relative whose age is of a great distance from the child. This effectively means the cousin of a parent is called an aunt or uncle, while those who are aged or in their senior years (aunts or uncles of a parent, or cousins of a grandparent) are termed Seanaintín and Seanuncail (grand-aunt and grand-uncle). Using this system, the children of cousins in a person’s own generation (however distant) are called nephews and nieces, using the terms Nia and Neacht. Grandchildren of brothers, sisters or cousins of the same generation are termed Garnia (grand-nephew) or Garneacht (grand-niece).

=== Col Gaolta ===
Col Gaolta is a word for cousin; in the Irish kinship system, this word is used for all relatives in one's generation or those near your age, except in the case of a brother or a sister. The word actually means related by blood.

=== Mo Mhuintir ===
Mo Mhuintir, being Irish for My People, is a vague term used for relatives people believe they are related to, but do not have enough information to determine how.
