= Sudanese kinship =

Kinship system used to define family

Sudanese kinship, also referred to as the descriptive system or bifurcate collateral kinship, is a kinship system used to define family. Identified by Lewis Henry Morgan in his 1871 work Systems of Consanguinity and Affinity of the Human Family, the Sudanese system is one of the six major kinship systems (Inuit, Hawaiian, Iroquois, Crow, Omaha and Sudanese).

The Sudanese kinship system is the most complicated of all kinship systems. It maintains a separate designation for almost every one of Ego's (the individual's) kin, based on their distance from Ego, their relation, and their gender, and in some instances based on relative age. The patrilineal and matrilineal line are differentiated. Ego's father is distinguished from Ego's father's brother and from Ego's mother's brother; Ego's mother is similarly distinguished from Ego's mother's sister and from Ego's father's sister; et cetera. For cousins, there are up to eight possible terms.

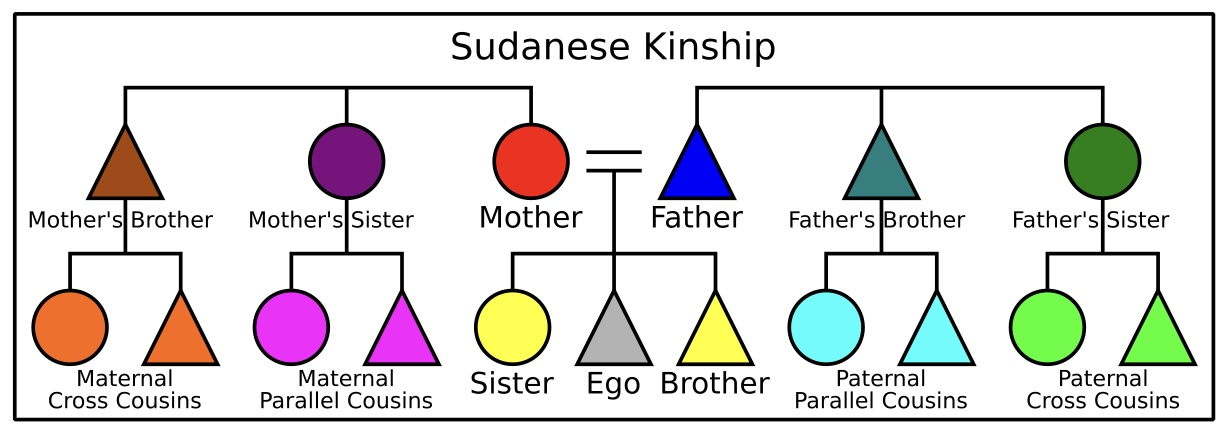

The diagram above depicts a two-generation example of the Sudanese kinship system. Circles correspond to female relatives and triangles to male relatives. Relatives marked with the same colour are called by the same kinship term (there may be sex-differentiation in Ego's generation in some languages).

== Usage ==
The system is named after the peoples of South Sudan. The Sudanese kinship system also existed in ancient Latin-speaking and Anglo-Saxon cultures. It exists today among present-day Arab, Turkish, and Chinese cultures. Among Germanic languages, it is present in Swedish. It tends to co-occur with patrilineal descent, and it is often said to be common in complex and stratified cultures.

=== Variants ===
Kinship terms in Arabic is almost completely Sudanese; however, for most relatives other than parents, the term for a female relative is generally considered to simply be the grammatical feminine form of the term for a male of the same degree (e.g. خَالَة khālah, "maternal aunt" vs. خَالَ khāl, "maternal uncle"). In addition, no distinction is made between paternal and maternal grandfathers (جَدّ jadd) or grandmothers (جَدَّة jaddah).

Balkan kinships such as Bulgarian, Serbian, and Bosniak follow this system for different patrilineal and matrilineal uncles but collapse 'mother's sister' and 'father's sister' into the same term, and Croatian and Macedonian further collapse the offspring of the uncles into one term.

Similarly, Finnish kinship terms separate paternal and maternal uncles but not aunts, while making no distinctions between first cousins but giving a separate term for second cousins. Further distinctions (some much more common than others) can be made between a patrilineal or matrilineal grandson/granddaughter, niece/nephew, grandfather/grandmother and others, by using compound words. An interesting feature is the presence of many unique words originating from Proto-Uralic and Germanic languages to describe affinal kinships such as, but not limited to, the brother of a spouse (lanko), mother-in-law (anoppi) or even the husband of a daughter (vävy). This extends into folk poetry, where in at least one dialect there are specific words solely for Ego's husband's siblings (kyty and nato).

On the opposite side of Eurasia, Chinese adds the additional dimension of relative age. Ego's older siblings and cousins are distinguished from younger ones (e.g. older brother, Mandarin: 哥哥 gēge or younger brother, Mandarin: 弟弟 dìdi), as are the siblings of Ego's parents. Similarly, a term for "uncle" or "aunt" (in at least in some varieties of Chinese, including Mandarin) does not exist without specificity, e.g. "father's older brother" (Mandarin: 伯伯 bóbo) or "father's younger brother" (Mandarin: 叔叔 shūshu). This does not apply to maternal uncles, who are addressed with the same word (Mandarin: 舅舅 jiùjiu).

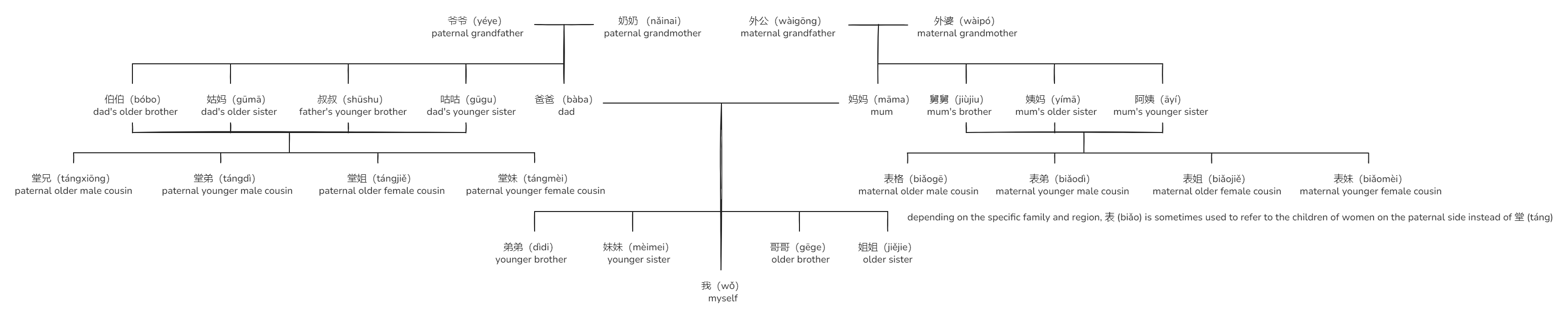
Mandarin Chinese family tree, non-extensive

== See also ==
- Chinese kinship
