= Crow kinship =

Kinship system used to define family

Crow kinship is a kinship system used to define family. Identified by Lewis Henry Morgan in his 1871 work Systems of Consanguinity and Affinity of the Human Family, the Crow system is one of the six major kinship systems (Inuit, Hawaiian, Iroquois, Crow, Omaha, and Sudanese).

== Kinship system ==
The system is somewhat similar to the Iroquois system, but distinguishes between the mother's side and the father's side. Relatives on the mother's side of the family have more descriptive terms, and relatives on the father's side have more classificatory terms.

The Crow system is distinctive because unlike most other kinship systems, it chooses not to distinguish between certain generations. The relatives of the subject's father's matrilineage are distinguished only by their sex, regardless of their age or generation. In contrast, within Ego's own matrilineage, differences of generation are noted. The system is associated with groups that have a strong tradition of matrilineal descent. In doing so, the system is almost a mirror image of the Omaha system, which is patrilineal.

As with the Iroquois system, the Crow uses bifurcate merging, meaning that there is a distinction between collateral relatives of different gender in Ego's descent group. In this case, father's brother would be called "father's brother", and mother's brother would be called "uncle". Only the Iroquois system uses bifurcate merging as a secondary name.

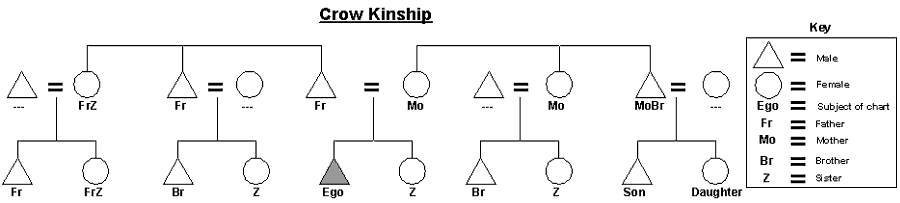
Graphic of the Crow kinship system

== Usage ==
The system is named for the Crow Tribe of Montana. The system appears frequently among various cultures. In the Southwestern US, it has traditionally been part of the Hopi Indian culture and the Navajo Nation.

== See also ==
- Family
- Kinship and descent
- Anthropology
- List of anthropologists

== Sources and external links ==
- William Haviland, Cultural Anthropology, Wadsworth Publishing, 2002. ISBN 0-534-27479-X
- Thomas Trautmann and Peter M. Whiteley, Crow-Omaha : new light on a classic problem of kinship analysis, University of Arizona Press, 2012. ISBN 978-0-8165-0790-0
- The nature of kinship
- Archnet: Crow kinship
- Crow Kin Terms
- "Crow Kinship & Social Organization", University of Idaho
