= Classificatory kinship =

Classificatory kinship systems, as defined by Lewis Henry Morgan, put people into society-wide kinship classes based on abstract relationship rules. These may have to do with genealogical relations locally (e.g., son to father, daughter to mother, daughter to father), but the classes bear no overall relation to genetic closeness. If a total stranger marries into the society, for example, they may be placed in the appropriate class opposite their spouse. It uses kinship terms that merge or equate genealogically distinct relatives from one another. Here, the same term is used for different kin.

The Dravidian kinship-term system, discovered in 1964, is an example of a classificatory kin-term logic.

Morgan believed this resulted from a "promiscuous" stage of evolutionary development, where it would have been impossible for tribes or families to tell a father from an uncle, a cousin from a brother and a son from a nephew. However modern anthropologists do not believe in this 'stage'.
