= Kinship =

Web of human social relationships

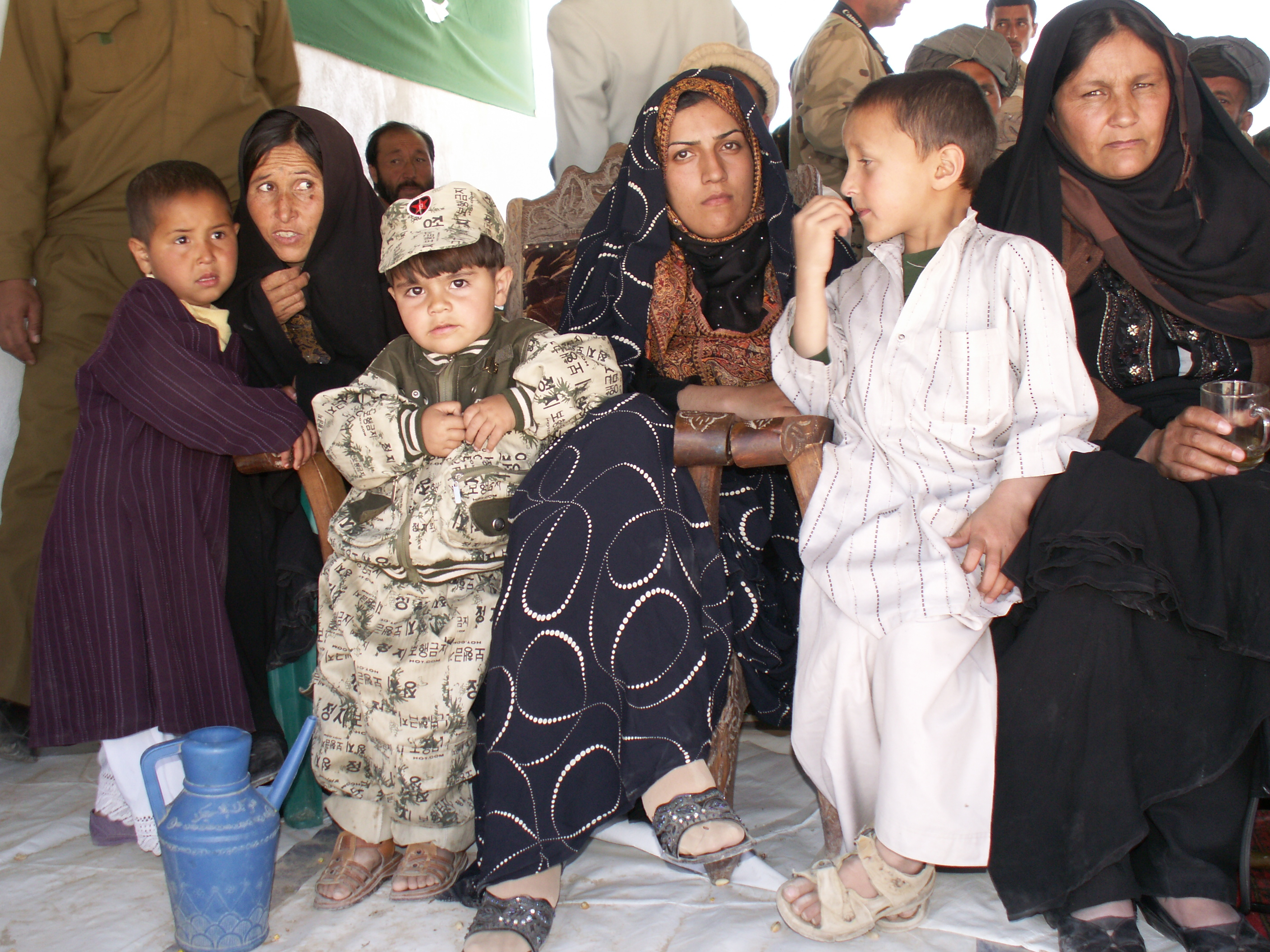
A multi-generational extended family in Chaghcharan, Ghor Province, Afghanistan

In anthropology, kinship is the web of social relationships that form an important part of the lives of all humans in all societies, although its exact meanings even within this discipline are often debated. Anthropologist Robin Fox says that the study of kinship is the study of what humans do with these basic facts of life – mating, gestation, parenthood, socialization, siblingship, etc. Human society is unique, he argues, in that we are "working with the same raw material as exists in the animal world, but [we] can conceptualize and categorize it to serve social ends". These social ends include the socialization of children and the formation of basic economic, political and religious groups.

Kinship can refer both to the patterns of social relationships themselves, or it can refer to the study of the patterns of social relationships in one or more human cultures (i.e. kinship studies). Over its history, anthropology has developed a number of related concepts and terms in the study of kinship, such as descent, descent group, lineage, affinity/affine, consanguinity/cognate and fictive kinship. Further, even within these two broad usages of the term, there are different theoretical approaches.

Broadly, kinship patterns may be considered to include people related by both descent – i.e. social relations during development – and by marriage. Human kinship relations through marriage are commonly called "affinity" in contrast to the relationships that arise in one's group of origin, which may be called one's descent group. In some cultures, kinship relationships may be considered to extend out to people an individual has economic or political relationships with, or other forms of social connections. Within a culture, some descent groups may be considered to lead back to gods or animal ancestors (totems). This may be conceived of on a more or less literal basis.

Kinship can also refer to a principle by which individuals or groups of individuals are organized into social groups, roles, categories and genealogy by means of kinship terminologies. Family relations can be represented concretely (mother, brother, grandfather) or abstractly by degrees of relationship (kinship distance). A relationship may be relative (e.g. a father in relation to a child) or reflect an absolute (e.g. the difference between a mother and a childless woman). Degrees of relationship are not identical to heirship or legal succession. Many codes of ethics consider the bond of kinship as creating obligations between the related persons stronger than those between strangers, as in Confucian filial piety.

In a more general sense, kinship may refer to a similarity or affinity between entities on the basis of some or all of their characteristics that are under focus. This may be due to a shared ontological origin, a shared historical or cultural connection, or some other perceived shared features that connect the two entities. For example, a person studying the ontological roots of human languages (etymology) might ask whether there is kinship between the English word seven and the German word sieben. It can be used in a more diffuse sense as in, for example, the news headline "Madonna feels kinship with vilified Wallis Simpson", to imply a felt similarity or empathy between two or more entities.

In biology, "kinship" typically refers to the degree of genetic relatedness or the coefficient of relationship between individual members of a species (e.g. as in kin selection theory). It may also be used in this specific sense when applied to human relationships, in which case its meaning is closer to consanguinity or genealogy.

== Basic concepts ==
=== Family types ===
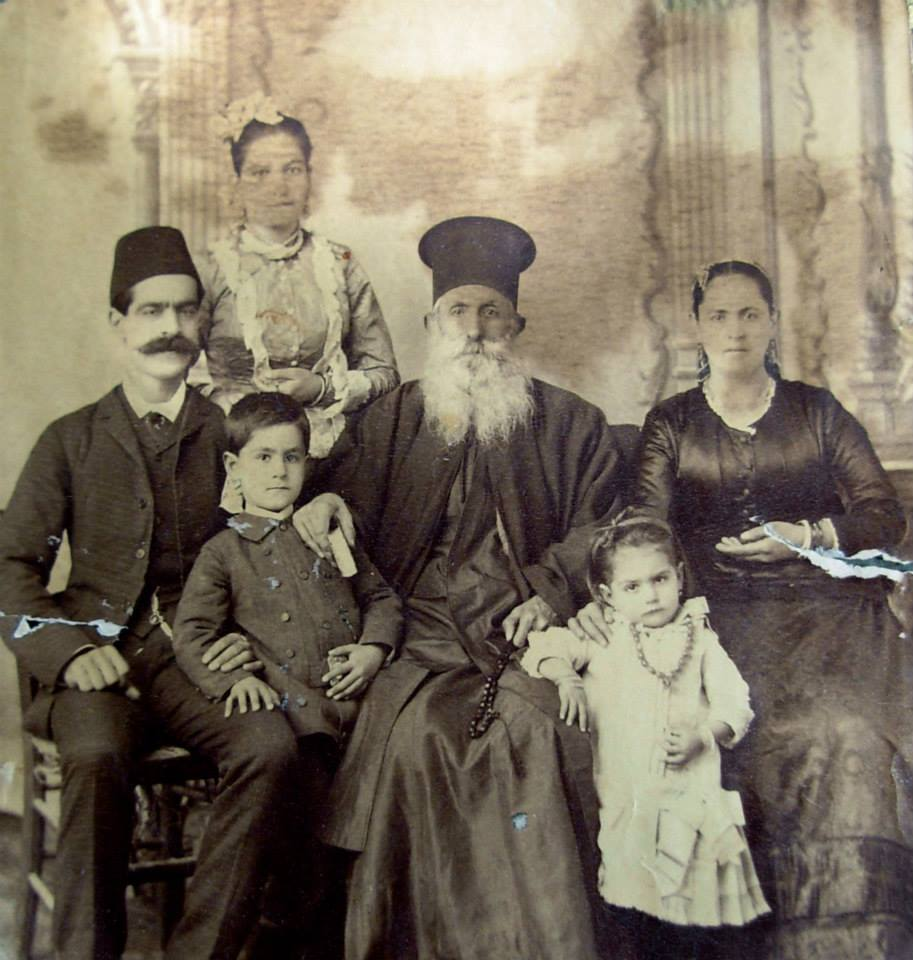
A multi-generational extended family of Eastern Orthodox priest in Jerusalem, c. 1893

Family is a group of people affiliated by consanguinity (by recognized birth), affinity (by marriage), or co-residence/shared consumption (see Nurture kinship). In most societies, it is the principal institution for the socialization of children. As the basic unit for raising children, Anthropologists most generally classify family organization as matrifocal (a mother and her children); conjugal (a husband, his wife, and children; also called nuclear family); avuncular (a brother, his sister, and her children); or extended family in which parents and children co-reside with other members of one parent's family.

However, producing children is not the only function of the family; in societies with a sexual division of labor, marriage, and the resulting relationship between two people, it is necessary for the formation of an economically productive household.

=== Terminology ===
A mention of "cȳnne" (kinsmen) in the Beowulf

Different societies classify kinship relations differently and therefore use different systems of kinship terminology – for example some languages distinguish between affinal and consanguine uncles, whereas others have only one word to refer to both a father and his brothers. Kinship terminologies include the terms of address used in different languages or communities for different relatives and the terms of reference used to identify the relationship of these relatives to ego or to each other.

Kin terminologies can be either descriptive or classificatory. When a descriptive terminology is used, a term refers to only one specific type of relationship, while a classificatory terminology groups many different types of relationships under one term. For example, the word brother in English-speaking societies indicates a son of one's same parent; thus, English-speaking societies use the word brother as a descriptive term referring to this relationship only. In many other classificatory kinship terminologies, in contrast, a person's male first cousin (whether mother's brother's son, mother's sister's son, father's brother's son, father's sister's son) may also be referred to as brothers.

The major patterns of kinship systems that are known which Lewis Henry Morgan identified through kinship terminology in his 1871 work Systems of Consanguinity and Affinity of the Human Family are:

- Iroquois kinship (also known as "bifurcate merging")
- Crow kinship (an expansion of bifurcate merging)
- Omaha kinship (also an expansion of bifurcate merging)
- Inuit kinship (referred to by Morgan as "Eskimo kinship" and also referred to as "lineal kinship")
- Hawaiian kinship (also referred to as the "generational system")
- Sudanese kinship (also referred to as the "descriptive system")

There is a seventh type of system only identified as distinct later:

- Dravidian kinship (the classical type of classificatory kinship, with bifurcate merging but totally distinct from Iroquois). Most Australian Aboriginal kinship is also classificatory.

The six types (Crow, Inuit, Hawaiian, Iroquois, Omaha, Sudanese) that are not fully classificatory (Dravidian, Australian) are those identified by Murdock (1949) prior to Lounsbury's (1964) rediscovery of the linguistic principles of classificatory kin terms.

==== Tri-relational kin-terms ====
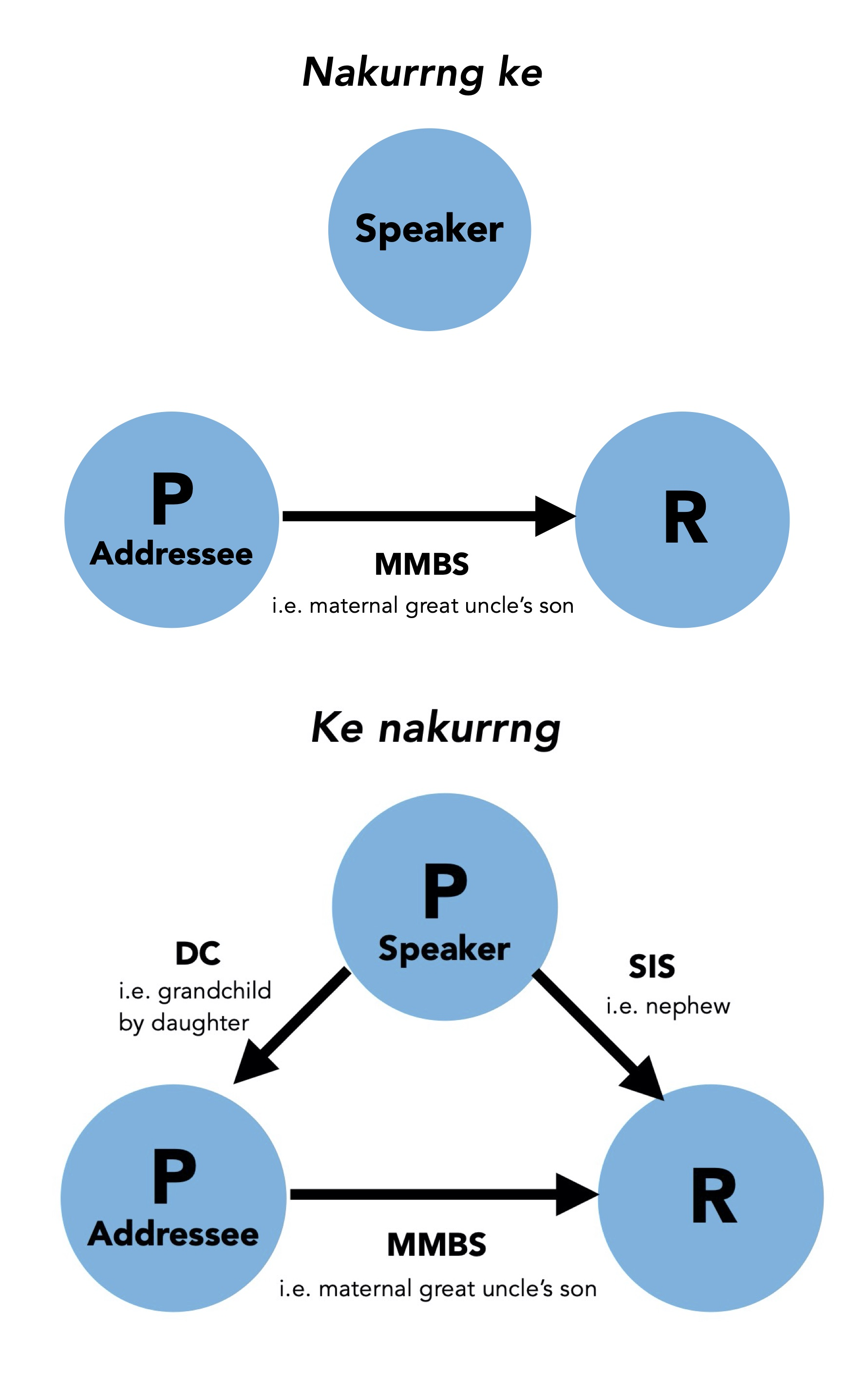
An illustration of the bi-relational and tri-relational senses of nakurrng in Bininj Kunwok

While normal kin-terms discussed above denote a relationship between two entities (e.g. the word 'sister' denotes the relationship between the speaker or some other entity and another feminine entity who shares the parents of the former), trirelational kin-terms—also known as triangular, triadic, ternary, and shared kin-terms—denote a relationship between three distinct entities. These occur commonly in Australian Aboriginal languages with the context of Australian Aboriginal kinship.

In Bininj Kunwok, for example, the bi-relational kin-term nakurrng is differentiated from its tri-relational counterpart by the position of the possessive pronoun ke. When nakurrng is anchored to the addressee with ke in the second position, it simply means 'brother' (which includes a broader set of relations than in English). When the ke is fronted, however, the term nakurrng now incorporates the male speaker as a propositus (P i.e. point of reference for a kin-relation) and encapsulates the entire relationship as follows:

- The person (Referent) who is your (Addressee) maternal uncle and who is my (Speaker) nephew by virtue of you being my grandchild.

==== Kin-based group terms and pronouns ====
Many Australian languages also have elaborate systems of referential terms for denoting groups of people based on their relationship to one another (not just their relationship to the speaker or an external propositus like 'grandparents'). For example, in Kuuk Thaayorre, a maternal grandfather and his sister are referred to as paanth ngan-ngethe and addressed with the vocative ngethin. In Bardi, a father and his sister are irrmoorrgooloo; a man's wife and his children are aalamalarr.

In Murrinh-patha, nonsingular pronouns are differentiated not only by the gender makeup of the group, but also by the members' interrelation. If the members are in a sibling-like relation, a third pronoun (SIB) will be chosen distinct from the Masculine (MASC) and Feminine/Neuter (FEM).

=== Descent ===
==== Descent rules ====
In many societies where kinship connections are important, there are rules, though they may be expressed or be taken for granted. There are four main headings that anthropologists use to categorize rules of descent. They are bilateral, unilineal, ambilineal and double descent.

- Bilateral descent or two-sided descent affiliates an individual more or less equally with relatives on his father's and mother's sides. A good example is the Yakurr of the Crossriver state of Nigeria.
- Unilineal rules affiliates an individual through the descent of one sex only, that is, either through males or through females. They are subdivided into two: patrilineal (male) and matrilineal (female). Most societies are patrilineal. Examples of a matrilineal system of descent are the Nyakyusa of Tanzania and the Nair of India. Many societies that practise a matrilineal system often have a matrilocal residence but men still exercise significant authority.
- Ambilineal (or Cognatic) rule affiliates an individual with kinsmen through the father's or mother's line. Some people in societies that practise this system affiliate with a group of relatives through their fathers and others through their mothers. The individual can choose which side he wants to affiliate to. The Samoans of the South Pacific are an excellent example of an ambilineal society. The core members of the Samoan descent group can live together in the same compound.
- Double descent (or double unilineal descent) refers to societies in which both the patrilineal and matrilineal descent group are recognized. In these societies an individual affiliates for some purposes with a group of patrilineal kinsmen and for other purposes with a group of matrilineal kinsmen. Individuals in societies that practice this are recognized as a part of multiple descent groups, usually at least two. The most widely known case of double descent is the Afikpo of Imo state in Nigeria. Although patrilineage is considered an important method of organization, the Afikpo considers matrilineal ties to be more important.

==== Descent groups ====
A descent group is a social group whose members talk about common ancestry. A unilineal society is one in which the descent of an individual is reckoned either from the mother's or the father's line of descent. Matrilineal descent is based on relationship to females of the family line. A child would not be recognized with their father's family in these societies, but would be seen as a member of their mother's family's line. Simply put, individuals belong to their mother's descent group. Matrilineal descent includes the mother's brother, who in some societies may pass along inheritance to the sister's children or succession to a sister's son. Conversely, with patrilineal descent, individuals belong to their father's descent group. Children are recognized as members of their father's family, and descent is based on relationship to males of the family line. Societies with the Iroquois kinship system, are typically unilineal, while the Iroquois proper are specifically matrilineal.

In a society which reckons descent bilaterally (bilineal), descent is reckoned through both father and mother, without unilineal descent groups. Societies with the Inuit system, like the Inuit, Yupik, and most Western societies, are typically bilateral. The egocentric kindred group is also typical of bilateral societies. Additionally, the Batek people of Malaysia recognize kinship ties through both parents' family lines, and kinship terms indicate that neither parent nor their families are of more or less importance than the other.

Some societies reckon descent patrilineally for some purposes, and matrilineally for others. This arrangement is sometimes called double descent. For instance, certain property and titles may be inherited through the male line, and others through the female line.

Societies can also consider descent to be ambilineal (such as Hawaiian kinship) where offspring determine their lineage through the matrilineal line or the patrilineal line.

==== Lineages, clans, phratries, moieties, and matrimonial sides ====
A lineage is a unilineal descent group that can demonstrate their common descent from a known apical ancestor. Unilineal lineages can be matrilineal or patrilineal, depending on whether they are traced through mothers or fathers, respectively. Whether matrilineal or patrilineal descent is considered most significant differs from culture to culture.

A clan is generally a descent group claiming common descent from an apical ancestor. Often, the details of parentage are not important elements of the clan tradition. Non-human apical ancestors are called totems. Examples of clans are found in Chechen, Chinese, Irish, Japanese, Polish, Scottish, Tlingit, and Somali societies.

A phratry is a descent group composed of three or more clans each of whose apical ancestors are descended from a further common ancestor.

If a society is divided into exactly two descent groups, each is called a moiety, after the French word for half. If the two halves are each obliged to marry out, and into the other, these are called matrimonial moieties. Houseman and White (1998b, bibliography) have discovered numerous societies where kinship network analysis shows that two halves marry one another, similar to matrimonial moieties, except that the two halves—which they call matrimonial sides—are neither named nor descent groups, although the egocentric kinship terms may be consistent with the pattern of sidedness, whereas the sidedness is culturally evident but imperfect.

The word deme refers to an endogamous local population that does not have unilineal descent. Thus, a deme is a local endogamous community without internal segmentation into clans.

==== House societies ====
In some societies kinship and political relations are organized around membership in corporately organized dwellings rather than around descent groups or lineages, as in the "House of Windsor". The concept of a house society was originally proposed by Claude Lévi-Strauss who called them "sociétés à maison". The concept has been applied to understand the organization of societies from Mesoamerica and the Moluccas to North Africa and medieval Europe. Lévi-Strauss introduced the concept as an alternative to 'corporate kinship group' among the cognatic kinship groups of the Pacific region. The socially significant groupings within these societies have variable membership because kinship is reckoned bilaterally (through both father's and mother's kin) and comes together for only short periods. Property, genealogy and residence are not the basis for the group's existence.

=== Marriage (affinity) ===
Marriage is a socially or ritually recognized union or legal contract between spouses that establishes rights and obligations between them, between them and their children, and between them and their in-laws. The definition of marriage varies according to different cultures, but it is principally an institution in which interpersonal relationships, usually intimate and sexual, are acknowledged. When defined broadly, marriage is considered a cultural universal. A broad definition of marriage includes those that are monogamous, polygamous, same-sex and temporary.

The act of marriage usually creates normative or legal obligations between the individuals involved, and any offspring they may produce. Marriage may result, for example, in "a union between a man and a woman such that children born to the woman are the recognized legitimate offspring of both partners." Edmund Leach argued that no one definition of marriage applied to all cultures, but offered a list of ten rights frequently associated with marriage, including sexual monopoly and rights with respect to children (with specific rights differing across cultures).

There is wide cross-cultural variation in the social rules governing the selection of a partner for marriage. In many societies, the choice of partner is limited to suitable persons from specific social groups. In some societies the rule is that a partner is selected from an individual's own social group – endogamy, this is the case in many class and caste based societies. But in other societies a partner must be chosen from a different group than one's own – exogamy, this is the case in many societies practicing totemic religion where society is divided into several exogamous totemic clans, such as most Aboriginal Australian societies. Marriages between parents and children, or between full siblings, with few exceptions, have been considered incest and forbidden. However, marriages between more distant relatives have been much more common, with one estimate being that 80% of all marriages in history have been between second cousins or closer.

=== Alliance (marital exchange systems) ===
Systemic forms of preferential marriage may have wider social implications in terms of economic and political organization. In a wide array of lineage-based societies with a classificatory kinship system, potential spouses are sought from a specific class of relatives as determined by a prescriptive marriage rule. Insofar as regular marriages following prescriptive rules occur, lineages are linked together in fixed relationships; these ties between lineages may form political alliances in kinship dominated societies. French structural anthropologist Claude Lévi-Strauss developed the alliance theory to account for the "elementary" kinship structures created by the limited number of prescriptive marriage rules possible.

Claude Lévi-Strauss argued in The Elementary Structures of Kinship (1949), that the incest taboo necessitated the exchange of women between kinship groups. Levi-Strauss thus shifted the emphasis from descent groups to the stable structures or relations between groups that preferential and prescriptive marriage rules created.

== History ==
One of the foundational works in the anthropological study of kinship was Morgan's Systems of Consanguinity and Affinity of the Human Family (1871). As is the case with other social sciences, Anthropology and kinship studies emerged at a time when the understanding of the Human species' comparative place in the world was somewhat different from today's. Evidence that life in stable social groups is not just a feature of humans, but also of many other primates, was yet to emerge and society was considered to be a uniquely human affair. As a result, early kinship theorists saw an apparent need to explain not only the details of how human social groups are constructed, their patterns, meanings and obligations, but also why they are constructed at all. The why explanations thus typically presented the fact of life in social groups (which appeared to be unique to humans) as being largely a result of human ideas and values.

=== Morgan's early influence ===
A broad comparison of (left, top-to-bottom) Hawaiian, Sudanese, Inuit, (right, top-to-bottom) Iroquois, Crow and Omaha kinship systems

Morgan's explanation for why humans live in groups was largely based on the notion that all humans have an inherent natural valuation of genealogical ties (an unexamined assumption that would remain at the heart of kinship studies for another century, see below), and therefore also an inherent desire to construct social groups around these ties. Even so, Morgan found that members of a society who are not close genealogical relatives may nevertheless use what he called kinship terms (which he considered to be originally based on genealogical ties). This fact was already evident in his use of the term affinity within his concept of the system of kinship. The most lasting of Morgan's contributions was his discovery of the difference between descriptive and classificatory kinship terms, which situated broad kinship classes on the basis of imputing abstract social patterns of relationships having little or no overall relation to genetic closeness but instead cognition about kinship, social distinctions as they affect linguistic usages in kinship terminology, and strongly relate, if only by approximation, to patterns of marriage.

=== Kinship networks and social process ===
A more flexible view of kinship was formulated in British social anthropology. Among the attempts to break out of universalizing assumptions and theories about kinship, Radcliffe-Brown (1922, The Andaman Islands; 1930, The social organization of Australian tribes) was the first to assert that kinship relations are best thought of as concrete networks of relationships among individuals. He then described these relationships, however, as typified by interlocking interpersonal roles. Malinowski (1922, Argonauts of the Western Pacific) described patterns of events with concrete individuals as participants stressing the relative stability of institutions and communities, but without insisting on abstract systems or models of kinship. Gluckman (1955, The judicial process among the Barotse of Northern Rhodesia) balanced the emphasis on stability of institutions against processes of change and conflict, inferred through detailed analysis of instances of social interaction to infer rules and assumptions. John Barnes, Victor Turner, and others, affiliated with Gluckman's Manchester school of anthropology, described patterns of actual network relations in communities and fluid situations in urban or migratory context, as with the work of J. Clyde Mitchell (1965, Social Networks in Urban Situations). Yet, all these approaches clung to a view of stable functionalism, with kinship as one of the central stable institutions. More recently, under the influence of "new kinship studies", there has been a shift of emphasis from the being to the doing of kinship. A new generation of anthropologist study the processes of doing kinship in new contexts such as in migrant communities and in queer families.

=== "Kinship system" as systemic pattern ===
The concept of "system of kinship" tended to dominate anthropological studies of kinship in the early 20th century. Kinship systems as defined in anthropological texts and ethnographies were seen as constituted by patterns of behavior and attitudes in relation to the differences in terminology, listed above, for referring to relationships as well as for addressing others. Many anthropologists went so far as to see, in these patterns of kinship, strong relations between kinship categories and patterns of marriage, including forms of marriage, restrictions on marriage, and cultural concepts of the boundaries of incest. A great deal of inference was necessarily involved in such constructions as to "systems" of kinship, and attempts to construct systemic patterns and reconstruct kinship evolutionary histories on these bases were largely invalidated in later work. However, anthropologist Dwight Read later argued that the way in which kinship categories are defined by individual researchers are substantially inconsistent. This not only occurs when working within a systemic cultural model that can be elicited in fieldwork, but also when allowing considerable individual variability in details, such as when they are recorded through relative products.

=== Conflicting theories of the mid 20th century ===
In trying to resolve the problems of dubious inferences about kinship "systems", George P. Murdock (1949, Social Structure) compiled kinship data to test a theory about universals in human kinship in the way that terminologies were influenced by the behavioral similarities or social differences among pairs of kin, proceeding on the view that the psychological ordering of kinship systems radiates out from ego and the nuclear family to different forms of extended family. Lévi-Strauss (1949, Les Structures Elementaires), on the other hand, also looked for global patterns to kinship, but viewed the "elementary" forms of kinship as lying in the ways that families were connected by marriage in different fundamental forms resembling those of modes of exchange: symmetric and direct, reciprocal delay, or generalized exchange.

=== Recognition of fluidity in kinship meanings and relations ===
Building on Lévi-Strauss's (1949) notions of kinship as caught up with the fluid languages of exchange, Edmund Leach (1961, Pul Eliya) argued that kinship was a flexible idiom that had something of the grammar of a language, both in the uses of terms for kin but also in the fluidities of language, meaning, and networks. His field studies criticized the ideas of structural-functional stability of kinship groups as corporations with charters that lasted long beyond the lifetimes of individuals, which had been the orthodoxy of British Social Anthropology. This sparked debates over whether kinship could be resolved into specific organized sets of rules and components of meaning, or whether kinship meanings were more fluid, symbolic, and independent of grounding in supposedly determinate relations among individuals or groups, such as those of descent or prescriptions for marriage.

From the 1950s onwards, reports on kinship patterns in the New Guinea Highlands added some momentum to what had until then been only occasional fleeting suggestions that living together (co-residence) might underlie social bonding, and eventually contributed to the general shift away from a genealogical approach (see below section). For example, on the basis of his observations, Barnes suggested:

[C]learly, genealogical connexion of some sort is one criterion for membership of many social groups. But it may not be the only criterion; birth, or residence, or a parent's former residence, or utilization of garden land, or participation in exchange and feasting activities or in house-building or raiding, may be other relevant criteria for group membership."(Barnes 1962,6)

Similarly, Langness' ethnography of the Bena Bena also emphasized the primacy of residence patterns in 'creating' kinship ties:

The sheer fact of residence in a Bena Bena group can and does determine kinship. People do not necessarily reside where they do because they are kinsmen: rather they become kinsmen because they reside there." (Langness 1964, 172 emphasis in original)

In 1972 David M. Schneider raised deep problems with the notion that human social bonds and 'kinship' was a natural category built upon genealogical ties and made a fuller argument in his 1984 book A Critique of the Study of Kinship which had a major influence on the subsequent study of kinship.

=== Schneider's critique of genealogical concepts ===
Before the questions raised within anthropology about the study of 'kinship' by David M. Schneider and others from the 1960s onwards, anthropology itself had paid very little attention to the notion that kinship bonds were anything other than connected to consanguineal (or genealogical) relatedness (or its local cultural conceptions). Schneider's 1968 study of the symbolic meanings surrounding ideas of kinship in American Culture found that Americans ascribe a special significance to 'blood ties' as well as related symbols like the naturalness of marriage and raising children within this culture. In later work (1972 and 1984) Schneider argued that unexamined genealogical notions of kinship had been embedded in anthropology since Morgan's early work because American anthropologists (and anthropologists in western Europe) had made the mistake of assuming these particular cultural values of 'blood is thicker than water', common in their own societies, were 'natural' and universal for all human cultures (i.e. a form of ethnocentrism). He concluded that, due to these unexamined assumptions, the whole enterprise of 'kinship' in anthropology may have been built on faulty foundations. His 1984 book A Critique of The Study of Kinship gave his fullest account of this critique.

Certainly for Morgan (1870:10) the actual bonds of blood relationship had a force and vitality of their own quite apart from any social overlay which they may also have acquired, and it is this biological relationship itself which accounts for what Radcliffe-Brown called "the source of social cohesion". (Schneider 1984, 49)

Schneider himself emphasised a distinction between the notion of a social relationship as intrinsically given and inalienable (from birth), and a social relationship as created, constituted and maintained by a process of interaction, or doing (Schneider 1984, 165). Schneider used the example of the citamangen / fak relationship in Yap society, that his own early research had previously glossed over as a father / son relationship, to illustrate the problem;

The crucial point is this: in the relationship between citamangen and fak the stress in the definition of the relationship is more on doing than on being. That is, it is more what the citamangen does for fak and what fak does for citamangen that makes or constitutes the relationship. This is demonstrated, first, in the ability to terminate absolutely the relationship where there is a failure in the doing, when the fak fails to do what he is supposed to do; and second, in the reversal of terms so that the old, dependent man becomes fak, to the young man, tam. The European and the anthropological notion of consanguinity, of blood relationship and descent, rest on precisely the opposite kind of value. It rests more on the state of being... on the biogenetic relationship which is represented by one or another variant of the symbol of 'blood' (consanguinity), or on 'birth', on qualities rather than on performance. We have tried to impose this definition of a kind of relation on all peoples, insisting that kinship consists in relations of consanguinity and that kinship as consanguinity is a universal condition.(Schneider 1984, 72)

Schneider preferred to focus on these often ignored processes of "performance, forms of doing, various codes for conduct, different roles" (p. 72) as the most important constituents of kinship. His critique quickly prompted a new generation of anthropologists to reconsider how they conceptualized, observed and described social relationships ('kinship') in the cultures they studied.

=== Post-Schneider ===
Schneider's critique is widely acknowledged to have marked a turning point in anthropology's study of social relationships and interactions. Some anthropologists moved forward with kinship studies by teasing apart biological and social aspects, prompted by Schneider's question;

The question of whether kinship is a privileged system and if so, why, remains without a satisfactory answer. If it is privileged because of its relationship to the functional prerequisites imposed by the nature of physical kinship, this remains to be spelled out in even the most elementary detail. (Schneider 1984, 163)

Schneider also dismissed the sociobiological account of biological influences, maintaining that these did not fit the ethnographic evidence (see more below). Janet Carsten employed her studies with the Malays to reassess kinship. She uses the idea of relatedness to move away from a pre-constructed analytic opposition between the biological and the social. Carsten argued that relatedness should be described in terms of indigenous statements and practices, some of which fall outside what anthropologists have conventionally understood as kinship;

Ideas about relatedness in Langkawi show how culturally specific is the separation of the 'social' from the 'biological' and the latter to sexual reproduction. In Langkawi relatedness is derived both from acts of procreation and from living and eating together. It makes little sense in indigenous terms to label some of these activities as social and others as biological. (Carsten 1995, 236)

Philip Thomas' work with the Temanambondro of Madagascar highlights that nurturing processes are considered to be the 'basis' for kinship ties in this culture, notwithstanding genealogical connections;

Yet just as fathers are not simply made by birth, neither are mothers, and although mothers are not made by "custom" they, like fathers, can make themselves through another type of performatively constituted relation, the giving of "nurture". Relations of ancestry are particularly important in contexts of ritual, inheritance and the defining of marriageability and incest; they are in effect the "structuring structures" (Bourdieu 1977) of social reproduction and intergenerational continuity. Father, mother and children are, however, also performatively related through the giving and receiving of "nurture" (fitezana). Like ancestry, relations of "nurture" do not always coincide with relations by birth; but unlike ancestry, "nurture" is a largely ungendered relation, constituted in contexts of everyday practical existence, in the intimate, familial and familiar world of the household, and in ongoing relations of work and consumption, of feeding and farming. (Thomas 1999, 37)

Similar ethnographic accounts have emerged from a variety of cultures since Schneider's intervention. The concept of nurture kinship highlights the extent to which kinship relationships may be brought into being through the performance of various acts of nurture between individuals. Additionally the concept highlights ethnographic findings that, in a wide swath of human societies, people understand, conceptualize and symbolize their relationships predominantly in terms of giving, receiving and sharing nurture. These approaches were somewhat forerun by Malinowski, in his ethnographic study of sexual behaviour on the Trobriand Islands which noted that the Trobrianders did not believe pregnancy to be the result of sexual intercourse between the man and the woman, and they denied that there was any physiological relationship between father and child. Nevertheless, while paternity was unknown in the "full biological sense", for a woman to have a child without having a husband was considered socially undesirable. Fatherhood was therefore recognised as a social and nurturing role; the woman's husband is the "man whose role and duty it is to take the child in his arms and to help her in nursing and bringing it up"; "Thus, though the natives are ignorant of any physiological need for a male in the constitution of the family, they regard him as indispensable socially".

== Biology, psychology and kinship ==
Like Schneider, other anthropologists of kinship have largely rejected sociobiological accounts of human social patterns as being both reductionistic and also empirically incompatible with ethnographic data on human kinship. Notably, Marshall Sahlins strongly critiqued the sociobiological approach through reviews of ethnographies in his 1976 The Use and Abuse of Biology noting that for humans "the categories of 'near' and 'distant' [kin] vary independently of consanguinal distance and that these categories organize actual social practice" (p. 112).

Independently from anthropology, biologists studying organisms' social behaviours and relationships have been interested to understand under what conditions significant social behaviors can evolve to become a typical feature of a species (see inclusive fitness theory). Because complex social relationships and cohesive social groups are common not only to humans, but also to most primates, biologists maintain that these biological theories of sociality should in principle be generally applicable. The more challenging question arises as to how such ideas can be applied to the human species whilst fully taking account of the extensive ethnographic evidence that has emerged from anthropological research on kinship patterns.

Early developments of biological inclusive fitness theory and the derivative field of Sociobiology, encouraged some sociobiologists and evolutionary psychologists to approach human kinship with the assumption that inclusive fitness theory predicts that kinship relations in humans are indeed expected to depend on genetic relatedness, which they readily connected with the genealogy approach of early anthropologists such as Morgan (see above sections). However, this is the position that Schneider, Sahlins and other anthropologists explicitly reject.

=== Nonreductive biology and nurture kinship ===
In agreement with Schneider, Holland argued that an accurate account of biological theory and evidence supports the view that social bonds (and kinship) are indeed mediated by a shared social environment and processes of frequent interaction, care and nurture, rather than by genealogical relationships per se (even if genealogical relationships frequently correlate with such processes). In his 2012 book Social bonding and nurture kinship Holland argues that sociobiologists and later evolutionary psychologists misrepresent biological theory, mistakenly believing that inclusive fitness theory predicts that genetic relatedness per se is the condition that mediates social bonding and social cooperation in organisms. Holland points out that the biological theory (see inclusive fitness) only specifies that a statistical relationship between social behaviors and genealogical relatedness is a criterion for the evolution of social behaviors. The theory's originator, W. D. Hamilton considered that organisms' social behaviours were likely to be mediated by general conditions that typically correlate with genetic relatedness, but are not likely to be mediated by genetic relatedness per se (see Human inclusive fitness and Kin recognition). Holland reviews fieldwork from social mammals and primates to show that social bonding and cooperation in these species is indeed mediated through processes of shared living context, familiarity and attachments, not by genetic relatedness per se. Holland thus argues that both the biological theory and the biological evidence is nondeterministic and nonreductive, and that biology as a theoretical and empirical endeavor (as opposed to 'biology' as a cultural-symbolic nexus as outlined in Schneider's 1968 book) actually supports the nurture kinship perspective of cultural anthropologists working post-Schneider (see above sections). Holland argues that, whilst there is nonreductive compatibility around human kinship between anthropology, biology and psychology, for a full account of kinship in any particular human culture, ethnographic methods, including accounts of the people themselves, the analysis of historical contingencies, symbolic systems, economic and other cultural influences, remain centrally important.

Holland's position is widely supported by both cultural anthropologists and biologists as an approach which, according to Robin Fox, "gets to the heart of the matter concerning the contentious relationship between kinship categories, genetic relatedness and the prediction of behavior".

=== Evolutionary psychology ===
The other approach, that of Evolutionary psychology, continues to take the view that genetic relatedness (or genealogy) is key to understanding human kinship patterns. In contrast to Sahlin's position (above), Daly and Wilson argue that "the categories of 'near' and 'distant' do not 'vary independently of consanguinal distance', not in any society on earth." (Daly et al. 1997, p282). A current view is that humans have an inborn but culturally affected system for detecting certain forms of genetic relatedness. One important factor for sibling detection, especially relevant for older siblings, is that if an infant and one's mother are seen to care for the infant, then the infant and oneself are assumed to be related. Another factor, especially important for younger siblings who cannot use the first method, is that persons who grew up together see one another as related. Yet another may be genetic detection based on the major histocompatibility complex (See Major Histocompatibility Complex and Sexual Selection). This kinship detection system in turn affects other genetic predispositions such as the incest taboo and a tendency for altruism towards relatives.

One issue within this approach is why many societies organize according to descent (see below) and not exclusively according to kinship. An explanation is that kinship does not form clear boundaries and is centered differently for each individual. In contrast, descent groups usually do form clear boundaries and provide an easy way to create cooperative groups of various sizes.

According to an evolutionary psychology hypothesis that assumes that descent systems are optimized to assure high genetic probability of relatedness between lineage members, males should prefer a patrilineal system if paternal certainty is high; males should prefer a matrilineal system if paternal certainty is low. Some research supports this association with one study finding no patrilineal society with low paternity confidence and no matrilineal society with high paternal certainty. Another association is that pastoral societies are relatively more often patrilineal compared to horticultural societies. This may be because wealth in pastoral societies in the form of mobile cattle can easily be used to pay bride price which favor concentrating resources on sons so they can marry.

The evolutionary psychology account of biology continues to be rejected by most cultural anthropologists.

== Extensions of the kinship metaphor ==
=== Detailed terms for parentage ===
As social and biological concepts of parenthood are not necessarily coterminous, the terms "pater" and "genitor" have been used in anthropology to distinguish between the man who is socially recognised as father (pater) and the man who is believed to be the physiological parent (genitor); similarly the terms "mater" and "genitrix" have been used to distinguish between the woman socially recognised as mother (mater) and the woman believed to be the physiological parent (genitrix). Such a distinction is useful when the individual who is considered the legal parent of the child is not the individual who is believed to be the child's biological parent. For example, in his ethnography of the Nuer, Evans-Pritchard notes that if a widow, following the death of her husband, chooses to live with a lover outside of her deceased husband's kin group, that lover is only considered genitor of any subsequent children the widow has, and her deceased husband continues to be considered the pater. As a result, the lover has no legal control over the children, who may be taken away from him by the kin of the pater when they choose. The terms "pater" and "genitor" have also been used to help describe the relationship between children and their parents in the context of divorce in Britain. Following the divorce and remarriage of their parents, children find themselves using the term "mother" or "father" in relation to more than one individual, and the pater or mater who is legally responsible for the child's care, and whose family name the child uses, may not be the genitor or genitrix of the child, with whom a separate parent-child relationship may be maintained through arrangements such as visitation rights or joint custody.

The terms "genitor" or "genetrix" do not necessarily imply actual biological relationships based on consanguinity, but rather refer to the socially held belief that the individual is physically related to the child, derived from culturally held ideas about how biology works. So, for example, the Ifugao may believe that an illegitimate child might have more than one physical father, and so nominate more than one genitor. J.A. Barnes therefore argued that it was necessary to make a further distinction between genitor and genitrix (the supposed biological mother and father of the child), and the actual genetic father and mother of the child making them share their genes or genetics .

=== Composition of relations ===
The study of kinship may be abstracted to binary relations between people. For example, if x is the parent of y, the relation may be symbolized as xPy. The converse relation, that y is the child of x, is written yP^{T}x. Suppose that z is another child of x: zP^{T}x. Then y is a sibling of z as they share the parent x: zP^{T}xPy → zP^{T}Py. Here the relation of siblings is expressed as the composition P^{T}P of the parent relation with its inverse.

The relation of grandparent is the composition of the parent relation with itself: G = PP. An uncle or aunt is the sibling of a parent, (P^{T}P)P, which can also be interpreted as the child of a grandparent, P^{T}(PP). Suppose x is the grandparent of y: xGy. Then y and z are cousins if yG^{T}xGz.

The symbols applied here to express kinship are used more generally in algebraic logic to develop a calculus of relations with sets other than human beings.

=== Modern Kinship ===
Kinship in modern society is so different from what it was. The family structure, religious practices and the experiments. Families are no longer limited to one family structure (nuclear). There is now adoption, divorce, and blended families. Migration has also influenced kinship, relatives that are in different countries can still maintain a relationship even while being so far away. This is possible communication of the present day. These changes have offered anthropologist the opportunity to look past the biological descent and marriage.

=== Chosen Family ===
Chosen family refers to the relationship where people consider others outside of their biological relatives to be family. These connections are built through trust. Also may include family or other caring people. Showing kinship can be built beyond the bloodline but rather than mutual commitment. Anthropologists study this to understand how people create family relationships in a different cultural setting.

== See also ==
- Consanguinity
- Darwinian anthropology
- Family
- Family history
- Fictive kinship
- Genealogy
- Heredity
- Inheritance
- Interpersonal relationships
- Kinist
- Kin selection
- Kinship terminology
- Lineage (anthropology)
- Nurture kinship

== Bibliography ==
- Barnes, J. A. (1961). "Physical and Social Kinship". Philosophy of Science. 28 (3): 296–299. doi:10.1086/287811. S2CID 122178099.
- Boon, James A.; Schneider, David M. (October 1974). "Kinship vis-a-vis Myth Contrasts in Levi-Strauss' Approaches to Cross-Cultural Comparison". American Anthropologist. 76 (4): 799–817. doi:10.1525/aa.1974.76.4.02a00050.
- Bowlby, John (1982). Attachment. Vol. 1 (2nd ed.). London: Hogarth.
- Evans-Pritchard, E. E. (1951). Kinship and Marriage among the Nuer. Oxford: Clarendon Press.
- Fox, Robin (1977). Kinship and Marriage: An Anthropological Perspective. Harmondsworth: Penguin.
- Holland, Maximilian (2012). Social Bonding and Nurture Kinship: Compatibility Between Cultural and Biological Approaches. Createspace Press.
- Houseman, Michael; White, Douglas R. (1998a). "Network mediation of exchange structures: Ambilateral sidedness and property flows in Pul Eliya" ( (PDF)). In Schweizer, Thomas; White, Douglas R. (eds.). Kinship, Networks and Exchange. Cambridge University Press. pp. 59–89. Archived from the original on 10 June 2019.
- Houseman, Michael; White, Douglas R. (1998b). "Taking Sides: Marriage Networks and Dravidian Kinship in Lowland South America" ( (PDF)). In Godelier, Maurice; Trautmann, Thomas; F.Tjon Sie Fat. (eds.). Transformations of Kinship. Smithsonian Institution Press. pp. 214–243. Archived from the original on 7 June 2019.
- Malinowski, Bronislaw (1929). The Sexual Life of Savages in North Western Melanesia. London: Routledge and Kegan Paul.
- Read, Dwight W. (2001). "Formal analysis of kinship terminologies and its relationship to what constitutes kinship". Anthropological Theory. 1 (2): 239–267. doi:10.1177/14634990122228719 (inactive 21 November 2026).
- Simpson, Bob (1994). "Bringing the 'Unclear' Family Into Focus: Divorce and Re-Marriage in Contemporary Britain". Man. 29 (4): 831–851. doi:10.2307/3033971. JSTOR 3033971.
- Trautmann, Thomas R. (2008). Lewis Henry Morgan and the Invention of Kinship, New Edition. University of California Press. ISBN 978-0-520-06457-7.
- Trautmann, Thomas R.; Whiteley, Peter M. (2012). Crow-Omaha: new light on a classic problem of kinship analysis. Tucson: University of Arizona Press. ISBN 978-0-8165-0790-0.
- Wallace, Anthony F.; Atkins, John (1960). "The Meaning of Kinship Terms". American Anthropologist. 62 (1): 58–80. doi:10.1525/aa.1960.62.1.02a00040.
- White, Douglas R.; Johansen, Ulla C. (2005). Network Analysis and Ethnographic Problems: Process Models of a Turkish Nomad Clan. New York: Rowman and Littlefield. ISBN 978-0-7391-1892-4. Archived from the original on 2013-10-05.
  - Signe Howell. 2009. Adoption of the Unrelated Child: Some Challenges to the Anthropological Study of Kinship. Annual Review of Anthropology 38:149-166. https://doi.org/10.1146/annurev.anthro.37.081407.085115
