= Systems of Consanguinity and Affinity of the Human Family =

1871 anthropology book by Lewis Henry Morgan

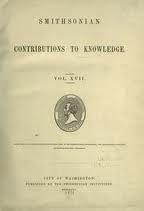
Title leaf of the 1871 edition of Systems of Consanguinity and Affinity of the Human Family.

Systems of Consanguinity and Affinity of the Human Family is an 1870 book written by Lewis Henry Morgan (1818–1881) and published by the Smithsonian Institution. It is considered foundational for the discipline of anthropology and particularly for the study of human kinship. It was the culmination of decades of research into the variety of kinship terminologies in the world conducted partly through fieldwork and partly through a global survey of kinship terminologies in the languages and cultures of the world.

It "created at a stroke what without exaggeration might be called the seminal concern of contemporary anthropology, the study of kinship..." In the book Morgan argues that all human societies share a basic set of principles for social organization along kinship lines, based on the principles of consanguinity (kinship by blood) and affinity (kinship by marriage). At the same time, he presented a sophisticated schema of social evolution based upon the relationship terms, the categories of kinship, used by peoples around the world. Through his analysis of kinship terms, Morgan discerned that the structure of the family and social institutions develop and change according to a specific sequence.

== Research ==
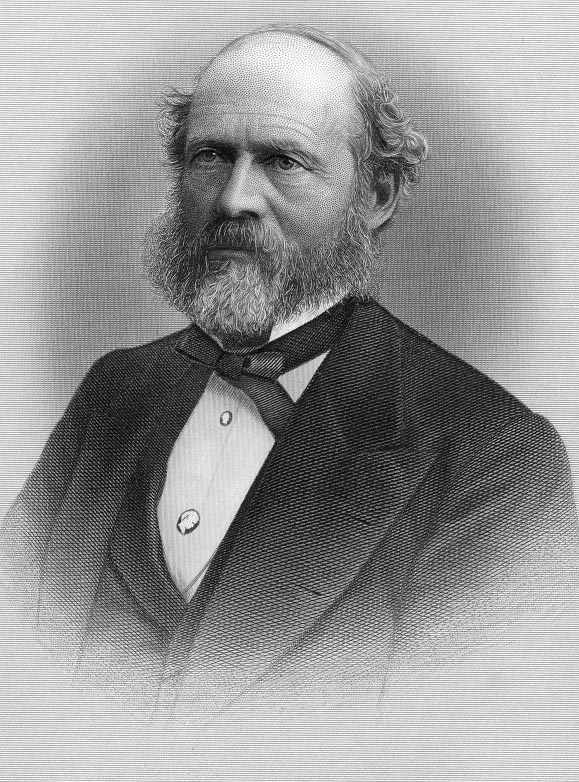
Lewis Henry Morgan

Morgan's interest in kinship systems came from his interest in the history and society of the Iroquois league, particularly the Seneca which he knew well. Studying Iroquois social organization, he discovered their matrilineal system of kinship reckoning, and this was what spurred his interests in kinship terminology. The Iroquoian kinship system used the same kin terms for all male blood relatives on the father's side (i.e., a father's brother is mentioned with the same term as father), and all female blood relatives on the mother's side (i.e., mother's sisters are mentioned with the same term as mother). This is a system later called "bifurcate merging" or Iroquoian kinship following Morgan. Having discovered that the typical European way of organizing kin relations was not universal, Morgan came to suspect that other languages in the Americas and perhaps in Asia had similar systems and began an investigation.

For the languages in Africa, Asia and Australia he relied on a survey administered through correspondence with missionaries. The questionnaire or "schedule" that Morgan used when he could not personally investigate, inquired about the terms for some 200 kin relations, for example "father's brother", "father's sister's son", etc.

Morgan also collected extensive data himself through fieldwork among Native American groups. In the consecutive summers from 1859 to 1862 Morgan traveled to the Midwest to collect kinship terminologies among the Indians there. He did not live in the Indian communities, but traveled around interviewing all Indians he encountered about their customs and kinship terms. The American Indian Wars were raging at the time, making the Western territories a dangerous place to travel. The first and second trips were to the territories of Kansas and Nebraska, and the third to Fort Garry, Winnipeg. On the fourth trip he traveled over 2,000 miles up the Missouri River to Fort Benton, Montana. Upon reaching Sioux City at the end of his 1862 field season he learned that his daughters Mary and Helen Morgan (2 and 6 years old respectively) had died of scarlet fever almost a month earlier. This devastated him and led him to forgo additional fieldwork.

== Publication ==
Morgan turned in the final manuscript in 1867, but the book was long delayed in publication. Moreover, due to publication costs its final published forms were shorter than Morgan wanted. The delay was due to the book's undergoing two rounds of peer review, a precaution taken by the agent of publisher Joseph Henry whose Smithsonian Institution was heavily invested in the publication.

Henry worried about the size of the manuscript, and he repeatedly asked Morgan to trim the manuscript by organizing the material better and getting rid of redundancies. At 600 pages the costs neared 8000 dollars, and at 16 dollars per page of stereotype, it was the most expensive work ever published by the Smithsonian Institution.

Waiting for publication was highly stressful for Morgan, who feared that someone else would be the first to publish the evolutionary scheme that he considered his main intellectual contribution. Overall, Morgan was not pleased with Henry's editorship, and he considered his demands of peer review and many rounds of revisions to be excessive. Morgan, a lawyer by profession, estimated that the effort of researching, writing, and producing the book cost him 25,000 dollars in expenses and lost profits.

Although copies of the manuscript had been circulating among the reviewers and other scholars already in 1870, the book was finally published in 1871 as the seventeenth volume of the Smithsonian's "Contributions to Knowledge" series.

Morgan wanted to dedicate the book to his two deceased daughters, and in a February 1867 letter to Joseph Henry, Morgan explained that he had "ever felt that I lost my children, in some sense by following this investigation, and I cannot divest my mind of the sense of justice which prompts the dedication." But Henry did not allow the work to have a dedicatory opening page, considering such sentimentality unsuitable for a scientific publication.

== Contents ==
Of the book's 600 pages, 200 were tables of kinship data from the world's languages. The tables were arranged in three sets based on linguistic-geographical groups: I. The Semitic, Aryan and Uralian families; II. The Ganowánian family (Morgan assumed that all the languages of the Americas were related and grouped them under this label); and III. The Turanian and Malayan family (Morgan considered Tamil to be the prototype of the Turanian languages). The main text was basically a commentary to the tables and was also divided into three parts that discussed first the peoples of Europe and Western Asia, then the peoples of the Americas, and finally the peoples of South and East Asia and Oceania.

In analyzing the data, Morgan observed that there were two basic kinds of kinship systems, which he called "descriptive" and "classificatory" respectively. The "descriptive" system had separate terms for each specific type of kinship relation, whereas the "classificatory" systems grouped several different relationship types under a single term, as for example in Iroquois where a father's brother is described with the term for father and mother's sisters are described with the term for mother. The Semitic, Aryan, and Uralian languages had the descriptive system, while the Ganowánian, Turanian, and Malayan languages had the classificatory system. Morgan explained this distinction as being caused by human societies becoming gradually more sophisticated in distinguishing between different relationship types.

Based on this idea of progressive improvement of systems of social organization, he argued that the primeval form of kinship among the earliest humans was a kind of "primitive promiscuity" in which everyone was considered equally related to everyone in their group because there was no knowledge of preferential partnerships, and even siblings married each other. From this ancient system developed a system of collective sibling marriage where a group of siblings married another group of siblings, which in turn eventually developed into the classificatory system based first on matrilineal, then on patrilineal principles, and finally becoming a fullfledged "descriptive" system such as that of English.

== Impact ==
Already in his own times Systems of Consanguinity made a significant intellectual impact. Karl Marx read both Systems and Morgan's subsequent book Ancient Society (1877) which built on and extended the arguments of the previous one. Morgan's thought became foundational in Marx's development of his theory about the relation between evolution, social organization, and historical materialism. Posthumously, Marx' notes on Ancient Society were edited by Friedrich Engels and published as The Origin of the Family, Private Property and the State.

The book also cemented the comparative study of systems of kinship as a core topic of anthropology. Much of the earliest work in anthropology was aimed at refuting Morgan's central theses about social evolution, primitive promiscuity, and group marriage. Franz Boas reacted against the social evolutionism in Morgan's work, but the Boasian cultural anthropology also saw the study of kinship systems and social organization as central. Bronisław Malinowski considered Morgan's work an outdated form of comparative ethnology, and referred to it only as an example how not to do anthropology. But Morgan was defended by scholars such as W. H. R. Rivers, who considered it a valid pursuit to understand cultural history by using the comparative method. Rivers' student A. R. Radcliffe-Brown was also highly critical of Morgan, but had an extensive knowledge of Systems of Consanguinity which he used as a basis for his own seminal studies of Native American kinship patterns. Neo-evolutionist anthropologists such as Leslie White also worked to rehabilitate Morgan's interest in cultural evolution. Anthropologists have generally agreed that Morgan's main discovery was that kinship terminology has relevance to the study of human social life. In this way, although Morgan's conclusions about social evolution are now generally considered speculative and fallacious, the methods he developed and the way he reasoned from his data were groundbreaking.

== Works cited ==
- Feeley-Harnik, Gillian (2002). "The Ethnography of Creation: Lewis Henry Morgan and the American Beaver". In Sarah Franklin; Susan McKinnon (eds.). Relative Values: Reconfiguring Kinship Studies. Duke University Press. pp. 54–85.
- Fortes, Meyer (1969). Kinship and the Social Order: the Legacy of Lewis Henry Morgan. Transaction Publishers.
- Morgan, Lewis Henry (1959). Leslie A. White (ed.). The Indian journals, 1859-62. Ann Arbor, University of Michigan Press.
- Morgan, Lewis Henry (1871). Systems of Consanguinity and Affinity of the Human Family. Washington DC: The Smithsonian Institution.
- Tooker, Elizabeth (1992). "Lewis H. Morgan and his contemporaries". American Anthropologist. 94 (2): 357–375. doi:10.1525/aa.1992.94.2.02a00050.
- Trautmann, Thomas R. (2008). Lewis Henry Morgan and the invention of kinship : with a new introduction and appendices by the author. Lincoln: University of Nebraska Press. ISBN 978-0-8032-6006-1.
- White, L. A. (1957). How Morgan came to write Systems of consanguinity and affinity. Michigan Academy of Science, Arts, and Letters.
- White, L. A. (1951). "Lewis H. Morgan's Western Field Trips". American Anthropologist. 53 (1): 11–18. CiteSeerX 10.1.1.1011.5669. doi:10.1525/aa.1951.53.1.02a00030.
