= Lewis H. Morgan =

American anthropologist (1818–1881)

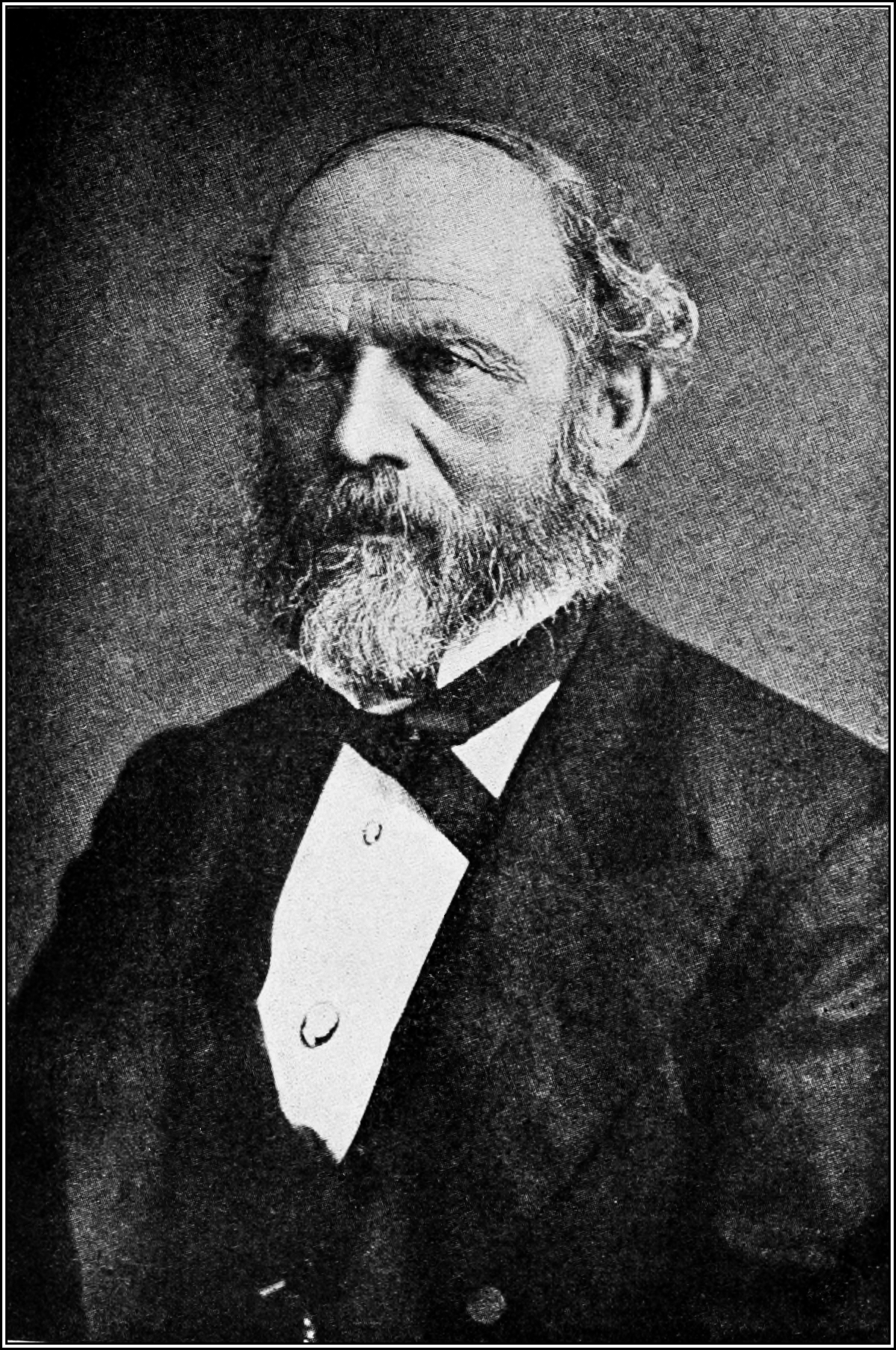
- Born: Lewis Morgan; November 21, 1818; Aurora, Cayuga County, New York, U.S.
- Died: December 17, 1881 (aged 63); Rochester, New York, US
- Other name: Tayadaowuhkuh (Seneca)
- Occupations: Anthropologist; social theorist; lawyer
- Spouse: Mary Elizabeth Steele (m. 1851)
- Children: 3

Lewis Henry Morgan (November 21, 1818 – December 17, 1881) was an American anthropologist and social theorist, who worked as a railroad lawyer. He is best known for his work on kinship and social structure, his theories of social evolution, and his ethnography of the Haudenosaunee (Iroquois). Interested in what holds societies together, he proposed the concept that the earliest human domestic institution was the matrilineal clan, not the patriarchal family.

Also interested in what leads to social change, he was a contemporary of the European social theorists Karl Marx and Friedrich Engels, who were influenced by reading his work on social structure and material culture, the influence of technology on progress. Morgan is the only American social theorist to be cited by such diverse scholars as Marx, Charles Darwin, and Sigmund Freud. Elected as a member of the National Academy of Sciences, Morgan served as president of the American Association for the Advancement of Science in 1880.

Morgan was a Republican member of the New York State Assembly (Monroe Co., 2nd D.) in 1861, and of the New York State Senate in 1868 and 1869.

== Biography ==
=== The American Morgans ===
According to Herbert Marshall Lloyd, an attorney and editor of Morgan's works, Lewis was descended from James Morgan, a Welsh pioneer. Various sources record that James and his brothers, Miles and John, the three sons of William Morgan of Llandaff, Glamorganshire, left Wales for Boston in 1636. From there John Morgan went to Virginia, Miles to Springfield, Massachusetts, and James to New London, Connecticut.

=== Early life and education ===
In 1797, Jedediah Morgan (1774–1826) married Amanda Stanton, settling on a 100-acre gift of land from his father. After she had five children and died, Jedediah married Harriet Steele of Hartford, Connecticut. They had eight more children, including Lewis. As an adult, he adopted the middle initial "H." Morgan later decided that this H, if anything, stood for "Henry".

At his death in 1826, Jedediah left 500 acres with herds and flocks in trust for the support of his family. This provided for education as well. Morgan studied classical subjects at Cayuga Academy: Latin, Greek, rhetoric and mathematics. His father had bequeathed money specifically for his college education, after giving land to the other children for their occupations. Morgan chose Union College in Schenectady. Due to his work at Cayuga Academy, Morgan finished college in two years, 1838–1840, graduating at age 22. The curriculum continued study of classics combined with science, especially mechanics and optics. Morgan was strongly interested in the works of the French naturalist Georges Cuvier.

Eliphalet Nott, the president of Union College, was an inventor of stoves and a boiler; he held 31 patents. A Presbyterian minister, he kept the young men under a tight discipline, forbidding alcoholic beverages and requiring students to get permission to go to town. He held up the Bible as the one practical standard for all behavior. His career ended with some notoriety when he was investigated by the state for attempting to raise funds for the college through a lottery. The students evaded his strict regime by founding secret (and forbidden) fraternities, such as the Kappa Alpha Society. Lewis Morgan joined in 1839.

=== The New Confederacy of the Iroquois ===
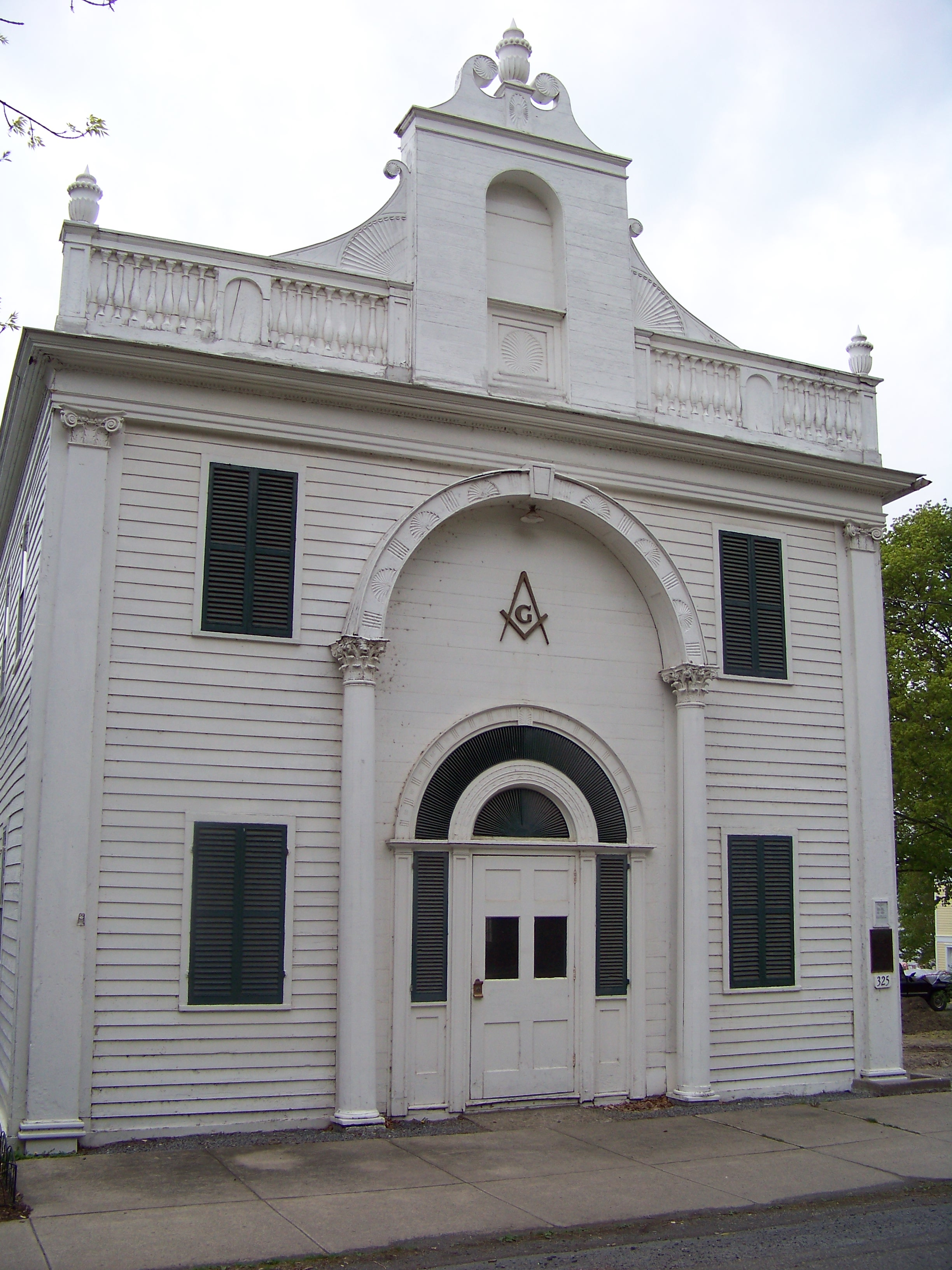
Masonic temple, constructed 1819 in Aurora. After "the Morgan Affair", the building was not used for freemasonry from 1827 to 1846. The Gordian Knot met on the second floor in the early 1840s. In 1847 the Scipio Lodge #110 started Masonic activities again.

After graduating in 1840, Morgan returned to Aurora to read the law with an established firm. In 1842 he was admitted to the bar in Rochester, where he went into partnership with a Union classmate, George F. Danforth, a future judge. They could find no clients, as the nation was in an economic depression, which had started with the Panic of 1837. Morgan wrote essays, which he had begun to do while studying law, and published some in The Knickerbocker under the pen name Aquarius.

On January 1, 1841, Morgan and some friends from Cayuga Academy formed a secret fraternal society which they called the Gordian Knot. As Morgan's earliest essays from that time had classical themes, the club may have been a kind of literary society, as was common then. In 1841 or 1842 the young men redefined the society, renaming it the Order of the Iroquois. Morgan referred to this event as cutting the knot. In 1843 they named it the Grand Order of the Iroquois, followed by the New Confederacy of the Iroquois.

The men intended to resurrect the spirit of the Haudenosaunee (Iroquois). They tried to learn the languages, assumed Haudenosaunee names, and organized the group by the historic pattern of the Haudenosaunee nations. In 1844 they received permission from the former Freemasons of Aurora to use the upper floor of the Masonic temple as a meeting hall. New members underwent a secret rite called inindianation in which they were transformed spiritually into Iroquois. They met in the summer around campfires and paraded yearly through the town in costume. Morgan seemed infused with the spirit of the Iroquois. He said, "We are now upon the very soil over which they exercised dominion ... Poetry still lingers around the scenery. ..." These new Iroquois retained a literary frame of mind, but they intended to focus on "the writing of a native American epic that would define national identity".

=== Encounter with the Haudenosaunee ===
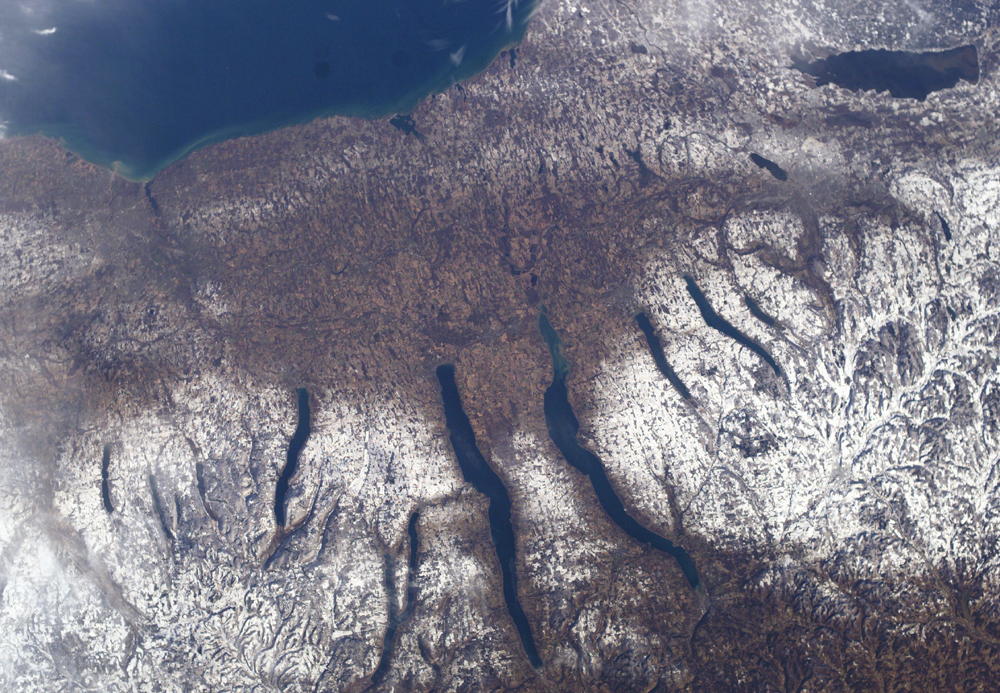
Finger Lakes, upstate New York

After the Revolutionary War, the United States had forced the four Haudenosaunee nations allied with the British to cede their lands and migrate to Canada. By specific treaties, the US set aside small reservations in New York for their own allies, the Onondaga and Seneca. In the 1840s, long after the war, the Ogden Land Company, a real estate venture, laid claim to the Seneca Tonawanda Reservation on the basis of a fraudulent treaty. The Seneca sued and had representatives at the state capital pressing their case when Morgan was there.

The delegation, led by Jimmy Johnson, its chief officer (and son of chief Red Jacket), were essentially former officers of what was left of the Haudenosaunee Confederacy. Johnson's 16-year-old grandson Ha-sa-ne-an-da (Ely Parker) accompanied them as their interpreter, as he had attended a mission school and was bilingual. By chance Morgan and the young Parker encountered each other in an Albany book store. Soon intrigued by Morgan's talk of the New Confederacy, Parker invited the older man to interview Johnson and meet the delegation. Morgan took pages of organizational notes, which he used to remodel the New Confederacy. Beyond such details of scholarship, Morgan and the Seneca men formed deep attachments of friendship.

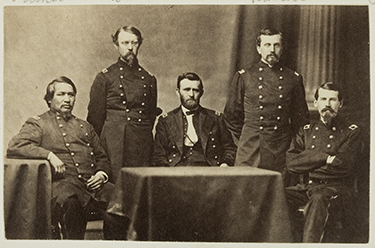
Grant's staff. Ely Parker sits on the left.

=== The Ogden Land Company affair ===
Meanwhile, the organization had had activist goals from the beginning. In his initial New Gordius address Morgan had said:

... when the last tribe shall slumber in the grass, it is to be feared that the stain of blood will be found on the escutcheon of the American republic. This nation must shield their declining day ...

In 1838 the Ogden Land Company began a campaign to defraud the remaining Haudenosaunee in New York of their lands. By Haudenosaunee law, only a unanimous vote of all the chiefs sitting in council could effect binding decisions relating to the tribe. The OLC set about to purchase the votes of as many chiefs as it could, plying some with alcohol. The chiefs in many cases complied, believing any resolutions to sell the land would be defeated in council. Obtaining a majority vote for sale at one council called for the purpose, the OLC took their treaty to the Congress of the United States, which knew nothing of Haudenosaunee law. President Martin Van Buren advised Congress that the treaty was fraudulent but on June 11, 1838, Congress adopted it as a resolution. After being compensated for their land by $1.67 per acre (Morgan said it was worth $16 per acre), the Seneca were to be evicted forthwith.

The great majority of the tribe were against the sale of the land. When they discovered they had been defrauded, they were galvanized to action. The New Confederacy stepped into the case on the side of the Seneca, conducting a major publicity campaign. They held mass meetings, circulated a general petition, and spoke to congressmen in Washington. The US Indian agent and ethnologist Henry Rowe Schoolcraft and other influential men became honorary members. In 1846 a general convention of the population of Genesee County, New York, sent Morgan to Congress with a counter-offer. The Seneca were allowed to buy back some land at $20 per acre, at which time the Tonawanda Reservation was created. The previous treaty was thrown out. Returning home, Morgan was adopted into the Hawk Clan, Seneca Tribe, as the son of Jimmy Johnson on October 31, 1847, in part to honor his work with the Seneca on the reservation issues. They named him Tayadaowuhkuh, meaning "bridging the gap" (between the Haudenosaunee and the European Americans).

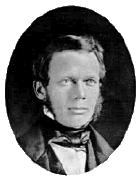
L. H. Morgan about 1848

After Morgan was admitted to the tribe, he lost interest in the New Confederacy. The group retained its secrecy and initiation requirements, but they were being hotly disputed. When internal dissent began to impede the group's efficacy in 1847, Morgan stopped attending. For practical purposes it ceased to exist, but Morgan and Parker continued with a series of "Iroquois Letters" to the American Whig Review, edited by George Colton. The Seneca case dragged on. Finally in 1857 the Supreme Court of the United States affirmed that only the federal government could evict the Seneca from their land. As it declined to do that, the case was over.

=== Marriage and family ===
In 1851 Morgan summarized his investigation of Haudenosaunee customs in his first book of note, League of the Iroquois, one of the founding works of ethnology. In it he compares systems of kinship. In that year also he married his cross-cousin, Mary Elizabeth Steele, his companion and partner for the rest of his life. She had intended to become a Presbyterian missionary. On their wedding day he presented to her an ornate copy of his new book. It was dedicated to his collaborator, Ely Parker.

In 1853 Mary's father died, leaving her a large inheritance. The Morgans bought a brownstone in a wealthy suburb of Rochester. In that year they had a son, Lemuel, who "turned out to be mentally handicapped". Morgan's rising fame had brought him public attention, and Lemuel's condition (on no specific evidence) was universally attributed to the first-cousin marriage. The Morgans had to endure perpetual criticism, which they accepted as true, Lewis going so far as to take a stand against cousin marriage in his book Ancient Society. The Morgan marriage nevertheless remained a close and affectionate one. In 1856, Mary Elisabeth was born and in 1860 Helen King.

Morgan and his wife were active in the First Presbyterian Church of Rochester, although it was mainly of interest to Mary. Lewis refused to make "the public profession of Christ that was necessary for full membership".

=== Supporting education ===
For several years "his ethnical interests lay dormant", but Morgan and other leading men of Rochester decided to found a university, the University of Rochester. It did not support the matriculation of women. The group resolved to found a college for women, the Barleywood Female University, which was advertised but apparently never started. In the same year of its foundation, 1852, the donor of the land on which it was to be located gave it to the University of Rochester instead. Morgan was gravely disappointed. He believed that equality of the sexes is a mark of advanced civilization. For the present, he lacked the wealth and connections to prevent the collapse of Barleywood. Later he would serve as a founding trustee of the board of Wells College in Aurora. In addition, he and Mary would leave their estate to the University of Rochester for the foundation of a women's college.

=== Success at last ===
In 1855 Morgan and other Rochester businessmen invested in the expanding metals industry of the Upper Peninsula of Michigan. After a brief sojourn on the 5-man board of the Iron Mountain Railroad, Morgan joined them in creating the Bay de Noquet and Marquette Railroad Company, connecting the entire Upper Peninsula by a single, ore-bearing line. He became its attorney and director. At that time the U.S. government was selling lands previously confiscated from the natives in cases where the sale benefited the public good. Although the Upper Peninsula was known for its great natural beauty, the discovery of iron persuaded Morgan and others to develop wide-scale mining and industrialization of the peninsula. He spent the next few years between Washington, lobbying for the sale of the land to his company, and in large cities such as Detroit and Chicago, where he fought lawsuits to prevent competitors from taking it.

In 1861 in the middle of his field work, Morgan was elected as Member of the New York State Assembly on the Republican ticket. The Morgans traditionally had belonged to the Whigs, which dissolved in 1856; most Whigs joined the Republicans, created in 1854. Morgan did not run with any agenda except his own as it pertained to the Iroquois. He was seeking appointment by the President of the United States as Commissioner of the new Bureau of Indian Affairs (BIA). Morgan anticipated that William H. Seward would be elected president, and outlined to him plans to employ the natives in the manufacture and sale of Indian goods.

=== Field anthropologist ===
After attending the 1856 meeting of the American Association for the Advancement of Science, Morgan decided on an ethnology study to compare kinship systems. He conducted a field research program funded by himself and the Smithsonian Institution, 1859–1862. He made four expeditions, two to the Plains tribes of Kansas and Nebraska, and two more up the Missouri River past Yellowstone. This was before the development of any inland transportation system. Passengers on riverboats could shoot Bison and other game for food along the upper Missouri River. He collected data on 51 kinship systems. Tribes included the Winnebago, Crow, Yankton, Kaw, Blackfeet, Omaha and others.

At the height of Morgan's anthropological field work, death struck his family. In May and June, 1862, their two daughters, ages 6 and 2, died as a result of scarlet fever while Morgan was traveling in the West. In Sioux City, Iowa, Morgan received the news from his wife. He wrote in his journal:

Two of three of my children are taken. Our family is destroyed. The intelligence has simply petrified me. I have not shed a tear. It is too profound for tears. Thus ends my last expedition. I go home to my stricken and mourning wife, a miserable and destroyed man.

=== The Civil War ===
Morgan was anti-slavery but opposed abolitionism on the grounds that slavery was protected by law. Before the war he assented to the possible division of the nation on the grounds of "irreconcilable differences", that is, slavery, between regions. Morgan began to change his mind when some of his friends who had gone out to watch the First Battle of Bull Run were captured and imprisoned by the Confederates for the duration. By the end of the war, he was insisting along with most others that Jefferson Davis be hanged as a traitor. In 1866 he formed the Rochester Committee for the Relief of Southern Starvation.

Morgan did participate indirectly in the war through his company. Recovering from the deaths of his daughters and having resolved to end the expeditions that had taken him away from home, he gave his life totally over to business. In 1863 he and Samuel Ely formed a partnership creating the Morgan Iron Company in northern Michigan. The war had created such a high demand for metals that within the first year of business, the company paid off its founding debt and offered 100% dividends on its stock. The demand went on until 1868, enabling the company to construct a blast furnace. Morgan became independently wealthy and could retire from the practice of law.

=== The Erie Railroad affair ===
Morgan took up trout fishing during his Michigan period. He fished in the wilds of Michigan during the summers, sometimes with Ojibwe guides. During this recreational activity, he became interested in beavers, which had greatly modified the lowlands. After several summers of tracking and observing beavers in the field, in 1868 he published a work describing in detail the biology and habits of this animal, which shaped the environment through its construction of dams.

Morgan was elected a member of the American Antiquarian Society in 1865.

From 1868 to 1869, Morgan served in the state government again as a senator, but still sought appointment as head of the Bureau of Indian Affairs. He was ridiculed by the Union Advertiser as being a "hobby candidate".

As member of the Standing Committee on Railroads, Morgan became embroiled in a major issue of the day and one closer to his interests: monopoly. The New York Central Railroad, under Cornelius Vanderbilt, had attempted a hostile takeover of the Erie Railroad under Jay Gould by buying up its stock. The two railroads competed for the Rochester market. Daniel Drew, Erie's treasurer, defended successfully by creating new stock, which he had his friends sold short, dropping the value of the stock. Vanderbilt dumped the stock, barely covering the losses. Ordinarily such stock manipulations were illegal. The Railroad Act of 1850, however, allowed railroads to borrow money in exchange for bonds convertible to stocks. Given essentially free stocks, friends of the Erie Railroad grew rich; that is, Drew had found a way to transfer Vanderbilt's wealth to his own friends. Vanderbilt just escaped ruin. He immediately appealed to the state government.

For one year, 1870–71, the three Morgans went on a grand tour of Europe. During his European travels, Morgan met Charles Darwin and the great British anthropologists of the age, including Sir John Lubbock.

He continued with his independent scholarship, never becoming affiliated with any university, although he associated with university presidents and the leading ethnologists looked up to him as a founder of the field. He was an intellectual mentor to those who followed, including John Wesley Powell, who became head of the Bureau of Ethnology in 1879 at the Smithsonian Institution. Morgan was consulted by the highest levels of government on appointments and other ethnological matters. In 1878 he conducted one final field trip, leading a small party in search of native ruins in the American Southwest. They were the first to describe the so-called Aztec ruins (actually built by the Ancestral Puebloans) on the Animas River but missed discovering Mesa Verde.

=== Death and legacy ===
In 1879 Morgan completed two construction projects. One was his library, an addition to the house he had purchased with Mary many years before and where he died in December 1881. He combined the opening of the library with a celebration of the 25th anniversary of The club. It included a dinner for 40 persons, who were by that time the leading lights of Rochester. The library acquired some fame as a local monument. Pictures were taken and published. The Club only met there one other time, however, at Morgan's funeral in 1881. The second building project was a mausoleum for his daughters in Mount Hope Cemetery. It became the resting place of the entire remainder of the family, starting with Lewis.

His wife survived him by two years. They both left wills. A nephew of Lewis moved to Rochester with his family and took up residence in the house to care for Lewis' and Mary's son. On the son's death 20 years later, the entire estate reverted to the University of Rochester, which by the terms of the wills was to use the funds for the endowment of a college for women, dedicated as a memorial to the Morgan daughters.

The Lewis Henry Morgan Lecture was established as a distinguished lecture held annually by the Department of Anthropology at the University of Rochester. Begun in 1963, the lectures honor the career and seminal research of American anthropologist Lewis H. Morgan. Many of the lectures have been published, including the inaugural one by South African anthropologist Meyer Fortes. The distinguished lecturers have been among the top names in anthropology, ranging from Meyer Fortes and Victor Turner to Emily Martin, Lila Abu-Lughod, and Paul Farmer. Recent Lewis Henry Morgan Lectures have been delivered by anthropologists Deborah A. Thomas, Sarah Lamb, Gabriella Coleman, Laurence Ralph, Janet Carsten, J. Lorand Matory, and Veena Das, among others.

== Thought ==
=== Work in ethnology ===
Based on his research enabled by Parker, Morgan and Parker wrote and published The League of the Ho-dé-no-sau-nee or Iroquois (1851). Morgan dedicated the book to Parker (who was then 23) and "our joint researches".

Morgan expanded his research far beyond the Haudenosaunee. Although Benjamin Barton had posited Asian origins for Native Americans as early as 1797, in the mid-nineteenth century, other American and European scholars still supported widely varying ideas, including a theory they were one of the lost tribes of Israel, because of the strong influence of biblical and classical conceptions of history.

With the help of local contacts and, after intensive correspondence over the course of years, Morgan analyzed his data and wrote his seminal Systems of Consanguinity and Affinity of the Human Family (1871), which was printed by the Smithsonian Press. It "created at a stroke what without exaggeration might be called the seminal concern of contemporary anthropology, the study of kinship ..."

=== Theory of social evolution ===
This original theory became less relevant because of the Darwinian revolution, which demonstrated how change happens over time. In addition, Morgan became increasingly interested in the comparative study of kinship (family) relations as a window into understanding larger social dynamics. He saw kinship relations as the basic part of society.

Looking across an expanded span of human existence, Morgan presented three major stages: savagery, barbarism, and civilization. He divided and defined the stages by technological inventions, such as use of fire, bow, pottery in the savage era; domestication of animals, agriculture, and metalworking in the barbarian era; and development of the alphabet and writing in the civilization era. In part, this was an effort to create a structure for North American history that was comparable to the three-age system of European pre-history, which had been developed as an evidence-based system by the Danish antiquarian Christian Jürgensen Thomsen in the 1830s; his work Ledetraad til Nordisk Oldkyndighed (Guideline to Scandinavian Antiquity) was published in English in 1848. The concept of evidence-based chronological dating received wider notice in English-speaking nations as developed by J. J. A. Worsaae, whose The Primeval Antiquities of Denmark was published in English in 1849.

Initially Morgan's work was accepted as integral to American history, but later it was treated as a separate category of anthropology. Henry Adams wrote of Ancient Society that it "must become the foundation of all future work in American historical science." The historian Francis Parkman also was a fan, but later nineteenth-century historians pushed Native American history to the side of the American story.

=== Influence on Marxism ===
In 1881, Karl Marx started reading Morgan's Ancient Society, thus beginning Morgan's posthumous influence among European thinkers. Friedrich Engels also read his work after Morgan's death. Although Marx never finished his own book based on Morgan's work, Engels continued his analysis. Morgan's work on the social structure and material culture strongly influenced Engels' sociological theory of dialectical materialism (expressed in his work The Origin of the Family, Private Property, and the State, 1884). Scholars of the Communist bloc considered Morgan as the preeminent anthropologist. Morgan's work has led some to believe that early communist-like societies existed in Native American society. This, and subsequent more accurate research, has led the society of the Haudenosaunee to be of interest in communist and anarchist analysis, particularly societal aspects where land was not treated as a commodity, communal ownership and near non-existent rates of crime.

=== Animal psychology and ethical views ===
In 1843 Morgan published "Mind or Instinct: An Inquiry Concerning the Manifestation of Mind by the Lower Orders of Animals" in The Knickerbocker. In this essay he presented a series of anecdotes, such as dogs returning to surgeons for treatment, beavers constructing dams cooperatively, ants gathering grain, and marmots posting lookouts, to argue that animals exhibit faculties of memory, foresight and reasoning. He dismissed "instinct" as an inadequate explanation, proposing instead that humans and other animals share a common mental principle expressed in varying degrees. The essay also challenged claims of human moral pre-eminence, citing the social order of bees, ants and beavers, and criticised cruelty towards animals, including hunting for sport and the killing of them for food. The essay was later cited by John Smith as an influence on his adoption of vegetarianism.

In 1857 Morgan returned to similar themes in an unpublished paper entitled "Animal Psychology", which he presented to the Pundit Club in Rochester, New York. The essay, later examined by Timothy D. Johnston, again rejected "instinct" as an explanatory principle and instead attributed animal behaviour to perception, memory, reflection, volition and reason. Morgan argued that humans and other species possessed the same kind of mental faculty, differing only in degree, and even speculated that animals might have moral capacities and immortal souls. Drawing on classical authors and natural history, he arranged species on a "scale of gradation" of intelligence, while remaining a creationist rather than an evolutionist. Johnston identifies the work as an unusually early critique of instinct within American comparative psychology, though it had little contemporary influence.

== Eponymous honors ==
- Annual lecture in Morgan's name at the Anthropology Department of the University of Rochester.
- Rochester Public School #37 in the 19th Ward named "Lewis H. Morgan #37 School"
- Lewis Henry Morgan Institute (a research organization), SUNYIT, Utica, New York
- Lewis H. Morgan Rochester Regional Chapter of the New York State Archeological Association

== List of Morgan's writings ==
Lewis Morgan wrote continuously, whether letters, papers to be read, or published articles and books. A list of his major works follows. Some of the letters and papers have been omitted. A complete list, as far as was known, is given by Lloyd in the 1922 revised edition (posthumous) of The League ... .

Date	Work	Publication
1841	"Essay on the History and Genius of the Grecian Race"	Unpublished
1841	"Essay on Geology"	Unpublished
1842	"Aristomenes the Messenian"	The Knickerbocker, January, 1843, pen name Aquarius
1843	"Thoughts on Niagara"	The Knickerbocker, September, 1843, pen name Aquarius
1843	"Mind or Instinct: An Inquiry Concerning the Manifestation of Mind by the Lower Orders of Animals"	The Knickerbocker, November–December, 1843, pen name Aquarius
1844	"Vision of Kar-is-ta-gi-a, a sachem of Cayuga"	The Knickerbocker, September, 1844, pen name Aquarius
1846	"An Essay on the Constitutional Government of the Six Nations of Indians"	Unpublished, except read to the New York Historical Society.
1851	The League of the Ho-dé-no-sau-nee or Iroquois (later edition)	Published by Sage and Brothers, Rochester.
1851	Report to the Regents of the University upon the articles furnished to the Indian collection	Published in the Third Annual Report of the Regents of the University of the Condition of the State Cabinet of Natural History and the Historical and Antiquarian Collection Annexed Thereto.
1852	"Diffusion against centralization"	Read to the Rochester Athenaeum and Mechanics' Association and published by D.M. Dewey.
1856	"The Laws of Descent of the Iroquois"	Proceedings of the American Association for the Advancement of Science, Volume XI. Read before the society.
1859	"The Indian Method of Bestowing and Changing Names"	Published in Proceedings of American Association for the Advancement of Science, Volume XIII.
1868	The American Beaver and his Works	Published by J.B. Lippincott and Company, Philadelphia.
1868	"A Conjectural Solution of the Origin of the Classificatory System of Relationship"	Proceedings American Academy of Arts & Sciences, February, Volume VII.
1868	"The Stone and Bone Implements of the Arickarees"	In the 21st Annual Report on the State Cabinet, Albany.
1871	Systems of Consanguinity and Affinity of the Human Family	Published by the Smithsonian Institution.
1872	"Australian Kinship"	Proceedings American Academy of Arts and Sciences, March, Volume VIII.
1876	"Montezuma's Dinner"	North American Review, April.
1876	"Houses of the Mound Builders"	North American Review, July
1877	Ancient Society	Published by Henry Holt and Company, New York.
1880	"On the Ruins of a Stone Pueblo on the Animas River in New Mexico, with a ground plan"	Published in the 12th Annual Report, Peabody Museum of Archaeology and Ethnology, Cambridge, Massachusetts.
1880	"Objects of an Expedition to New Mexico and Central America"	Paper given to the Archaeological Institute of America, Boston, in March.
1880	"A Study of the Houses of the American Aborigines, with a scheme of exploration of the Ruins in New Mexico and elsewhere"	Published in the 1st Annual Report of the Archaeological Institute of America.
1881	Houses and House-life of the American Aborigines	In Contributions to North American Ethnology, Volume IV, published by the United States Geological Survey.

== See also ==
- Cultural evolution
- Sociocultural evolution
- Ethnology
- Unilineal evolution
- Origins of society
- List of important publications in anthropology

== Bibliography ==
- Conn, Steven (2004). History's Shadow: Native Americans and Historical Consciousness in the Nineteenth Century. Chicago: University of Chicago Press.
- Deloria, Philip Joseph (1998) [1994]. Playing Indian. Yale Historical Publications. New Haven: Department of History of Yale University.
- Feeley-Harnik, Gillian (2001). "'The Mystery of Life in All Its Forms': Religious Dimensions in the Culture of Early American Anthropology". In Mizruchi, Susan Laura (ed.). Religion and Cultural Studies. Princeton: Princeton University Press. pp. 140–191..
- Lloyd, Herbert M. (1922). "Appendix B, Notes". In Lloyd, Herbert Marshall (ed.). League of the Ho-de-no-sau-nee, or Iroquois. Vol. II (New ed.). New York: Dodd, Mead and Company. pp. 145–310..
- Morgan, Lewis Henry (1993). White, Leslie A. (ed.). The Indian Journals, 1859-62. New York: Dover Publications.
- Moses, Daniel Noah (2009). The Promise of Progress: The Life and Work of Lewis Henry Morgan. Columbia: University of Missouri Press.
- Porter, Charles T. (1922). "Personal Reminiscences". In Lloyd, Herbert Marshall (ed.). League of the Ho-de-no-sau-nee, or Iroquois. Vol. II (New ed.). New York: Dodd, Mead and Company. pp. 153–161.
- Stern, Bernhard J. "Lewis Henry Morgan Today; An Appraisal of His Scientific Contributions", Science & Society, vol. 10, no. 2 (Spring 1946), pp. 172–176. In JSTOR.
- Trautman, Thomas R.; Kabelac, Karl Sanford (1994). The Library of Lewis Henry Morgan and Mary Elizabeth Morgan. Transactions of the American Philosophical Society, volume 84, Parts 6-7. Philadelphia: The American Philosophical Society.
- White, Leslie A. (1951). "Lewis H. Morgan's Western Field Trips" (PDF). American Anthropologist. 53: 11–18. doi:10.1525/aa.1951.53.1.02a00030.

New York State Assembly
Preceded by Elias Pond	New York State Assembly; Monroe County, 2nd District; 1861	Succeeded by Eliphaz Trimmer
New York State Senate
Preceded by Thomas Parsons	New York State Senate; 28th District; 1868–1869	Succeeded by Jarvis Lord
