= Ancient Society =

Book by Lewis Henry Morgan

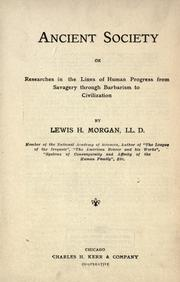
- Author: Lewis H. Morgan
- Language: English
- Published: 1877
- Publication place: United States

Ancient Society is an 1877 book by the American anthropologist Lewis H. Morgan. Building on the data about kinship and social organization presented in his 1871 Systems of Consanguinity and Affinity of the Human Family, Morgan develops his theory of the three stages of human progress, i.e., from Savagery through Barbarism to Civilization. Contemporary European social theorists such as Karl Marx and Friedrich Engels were influenced by Morgan's work on social structure and material culture, as shown by Engels' The Origin of the Family, Private Property, and the State (1884).

== The concept of progress ==
The dominant idea of Morgan's thought is that of progress. He conceived it as a career of social states arranged in a scale on which man has worked his way up from the bottom. Progress is historically true of the entire human family, but not uniformly. Different branches of the family have evidenced human advancement to different conditions. He thought the scale had universal application or substantially the same in kind, with deviations from uniformity ... produced by special causes. Morgan hopes therefore to discern the principal stages of human development.

Morgan arrived at the idea of a society's progress in part through analogy to individual development. It is an ascent to human supremacy on the earth. The prime analogate is an individual working his way up in society; that is, Morgan, who was well read in classics, relies on the Roman cursus honorum, rising through the ranks, which became the basis of the English ideas of career and working your way up, to which he blends in the rationalist idea of a scala, or ladder, of life. The idea of growth or development is also borrowed from individuals. He proposed that a society has a life like that of an individual, which develops and grows.

He gives the analogy an anthropological twist and introduces the comparative method coming into vogue in other disciplines. Lewis names units called ethna, by which he means inventions, discoveries and domestic institutions. The ethna are compared and judged higher or lower on the scale, pair by pair. Morgan's ethna appear to comprise at least some of Edward Burnett Tylor's cultural objects. Morgan mentions Tylor a number of times in the book.

Morgan's standard of higher or lower is not clearly expressed. By higher he appears to mean whatever contributes better to control over the environment, victory over competitors, and spread of population. He does not mention Charles Darwin's theory of evolution, but Darwin referred to Morgan's work in his own.

== The lines of progress ==
The substitutions of ethna better than the previous follow several lines of progress. Morgan admits to a deficit in knowledge of language development, which he does not think important. The little knowledge he shares can be found in Chapter 3. His brief scheme is in fact speculative only. Many Sino-Tibetan languages and Tai–Kadai languages, which may appear to non-speakers be "monosyllabic", use tone to distinguish morphemes, One syllable in different tones has different meanings. No language today is considered more primitive than any other. Early stages of language are totally unknown and must have disappeared in remote prehistory. Gestural language still is considered the original form of symbolic communication.

No.	Line	Ethna
I	Subsistence	The arts of subsistence are: Natural Subsistence upon Fruits and Roots, Fish Subsistence, Farinaceous Subsistence through Cultivation, Meat and Milk Subsistence, Unlimited Subsistence through Field Agriculture
II	Government	
III	Language	The origin of language is: Gesture Language using natural symbols.; Monosyllabical language, the first phase of articulate language.; Syllabical Language.
IV	The Family	The forms of family are: Consanguine, ... the intermarriage of brothers and sisters.; Punaluan, a Hawaiian custom. ... the intermarriage of several brothers to each other's wives ... and of several sisters to each other's husbands... where "brother" meant all the males in one generation of an extended family and "sister" meant all the females, etc.; Syndyasmian. Monogamous marriage without exclusive cohabitation.; Patriarchal.... the marriage of one man to several wives.; Monogamian.... the marriage of one man with one woman, with an exclusive cohabitation.
V	Religion	
VI	House Life and Architecture	
VII	Property	

== The ethnical periods ==
Morgan rejects the Ages of Stone, of Bronze, of Iron, the Three-Age System of pre-history, as being insufficient characterizations of progress. This theory had been explicated by J. J. A. Worsaae in his The Primeval Antiquities of Denmark, published in English in 1849. Worsaae had built his work on the foundation of evidence-based chronology by Christian Jürgensen Thomsen, whose Guideline to Scandinavian Antiquity (Ledetraad til Nordisk Oldkyndighed) (1836), was not published in English until 1848. The two works were highly influential to researchers in Great Britain and North America.

Morgan believed the prehistoric stages as defined by the Danish were difficult to distinguish, as they overlapped and refer only to material types of implements or tools. In addition, Morgan thought they did not fit the evidence he was finding among Native American societies in North America, in which he had closely studied social structure as an indicator of stages of civilization. Since Morgan, the European three-age system has prevailed in anthropology and archeology, but the age characteristics have been enlarged to include many of the additional factors which Morgan described. Morgan's Savagery and Barbarism are roughly equivalent to Braidwood's food gathering and food production.

Based on the lines of progress, he distinguishes ethnical periods, which each have a distinct culture and a particular mode of life and do not overlap in a region. He does admit to exceptions and a difficulty of determining precise borders between periods. Scientific archaeology was being developed at this time; Morgan did not have the techniques of stratigraphy or scientific dating available, but based his arguments on linguistic and historical speculation.

=== Chronological dating ===
Christian Jürgensen Thomsen and J. J. A. Worsaae are credited with the foundation of scientific archaeology, as they worked to have controlled excavations in which artifacts could be evaluated by which were found together: the beginning of stratigraphy. This supposedly evidence-based system was the start of chronological dating in archeology.

Period	Subperiod	Ethna
Savagery: Natural Subsistence, at least 60,000 years.	Lower	First distinction of man from the other animals. Fruits and Roots, tropical or subtropical habitats, at least partial tree-dwelling, gesture language, intelligence, Consanguine Family.
Savagery: Natural Subsistence, at least 60,000 years.	Middle	Fish Subsistence, Use of Fire, spread of man worldwide along shorelines, monosyllabic language, Punaluan Family. Morgan adduces this spread from the presence of stone tools along the shorelines, but appeared not to realize there were huntsmen.
Savagery: Natural Subsistence, at least 60,000 years.	Upper	Weapons: bow and arrow, club, spear; addition of game to diet, cannibalism, syllabical language, Syndyasmian Family, organization into gentes, phratries and tribes, worship of the elements.
Barbarism: Cultivation, Domestication. 35,000 years in total to reach Upper Barbarism. 20,000 year for Lower; 15,000 years for Middle.	Lower	Horticulture: maize, bean, squash, tobacco; art of pottery, tribal confederacy, finger weaving, blow-gun, village stockade, tribal games, element worship, Great Spirit, formation of Aryan and Semitic families.
Barbarism: Cultivation, Domestication. 35,000 years in total to reach Upper Barbarism. 20,000 year for Lower; 15,000 years for Middle.	Middle	Domestication of animals among the Semitic and Aryan families: goat, sheep, horse, ass, cow, dog; milk, making bronze, irrigation, great joint tenement houses in the nature of fortresses.
Barbarism: Cultivation, Domestication. 35,000 years in total to reach Upper Barbarism. 20,000 year for Lower; 15,000 years for Middle.	Upper	Cultivation of cereals and plants, smelting iron ore, poetry, mythology, walled cities, wheeled vehicles, metallic armor and weapons (bronze and iron), the forge, potter's wheel, grain mill, loom weaving, forging, monogamian family, individual property, municipal life, popular assembly, by the Aryans. Morgan uses Aryan to mean Indo-European daughter-language speakers, including Greek, Latin, English, etc. Vere Gordon Childe was perhaps the last of the modern thinkers to use the term in that sense. Morgan used Semites to mean what today's scholars mean when they use that term. Although Morgan seems to view the Aryans primarily and the Semites secondarily as the innovators of civilization, he does not attribute a master race to them. For this list Morgan intended the Homeric poems as a guide. The existence of the Late Bronze Age was then little known. To Morgan Upper Barbarism was what today is called the early Iron Age.
Civilization: Field Agriculture, 5000 years.	Ancient	Plow with an iron point, iron implements, animal power, unlimited subsistence, phonetic alphabet, writing, Arabic numerals, the military art, the city, commerce, coinage, the state, founded upon territory and upon property, the bridge, arch, crane, water-wheel, sewer. Morgan's Ancient civilization related to classical Greece and the city of Rome.
Civilization: Field Agriculture, 5000 years.	Mediaeval	Gothic architecture, feudal aristocracy with hereditary titles of rank, hierarchy under the headship of a pope. Morgan has little to say about the mediaeval period.
Civilization: Field Agriculture, 5000 years.	Modern	Telegraph, coal gas, spinning-jenny, power loom, steam engine, telescope, printing, canal lock, compass, gunpowder, photography, modern science, religious freedom, public schools, representative democracy, classes, different types of law.

== From savagery to civilization ==
John Wesley Powell credited Ancient Society as "the most noteworthy attempt hitherto made to distinguish and define culture-stages". Powell theorized that savages advanced into civilization with the help of racial and cultural mixing. Therefore, Powell reasoned, civilized people could help savages by mixing blood, rather than spilling blood. Powell also contended, that "human evolution has none of the characteristics of animal evolution". Powell opposed the survival of the fittest theory because in his mind, humans did not advance their living conditions to succeed in the struggle for existence. Instead, he mused that the "human endeavor to secure happiness" was the driving force of civilization. Powell also added a fourth stage to Morgan's stages of human progress: enlightenment, which constituted industrialization and its nation states, bureaucracies, and corporations. He argued that "civilized" cultures like the United States could bring Native Americans to a higher stage of culture by destroying local game and encouraging other forms of subsistence like farming.

Morgan thought that most Native American tribes were savage or barbarian, and was worried that they would be overtaken by more civilized cultures in the 19th century. He claimed that landownership was critical to cultural progression, and influenced multiple assimilation activists in their quest to “civilize" indigenous tribes.

== Reception ==
In addition to positive receptions by John Wesley Powell and Karl Marx, historian Henry Adams called for Ancient Society to be the "foundation for all future works" in American history.
