= Christian Jürgensen Thomsen =

Danish antiquarian

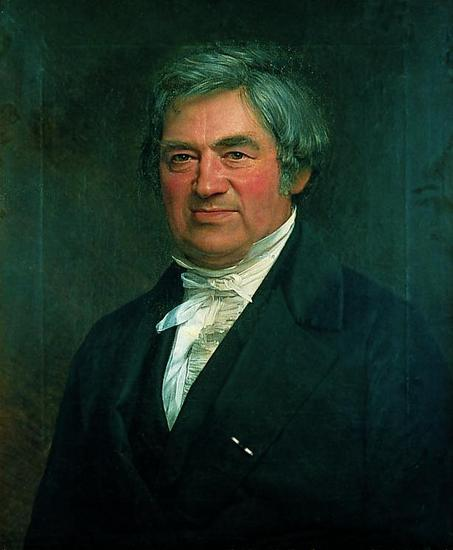
- J. V. Gertner, Christian Jürgensen Thomsen, 1849
- Born: 29 December 1788; Copenhagen, Denmark–Norway
- Died: 21 May 1865 (aged 76); Copenhagen, Kingdom of Denmark
- Known for: Introducing the three-age system
- Scientific career
- Fields: Archeology; Museum administration

Christian Jürgensen Thomsen (29 December 1788 – 21 May 1865) was a Danish antiquarian who developed early archaeological techniques and methods.

In 1816 he was appointed head of 'antiquarian' collections which later developed into the National Museum of Denmark in Copenhagen. While organizing and classifying the antiquities for exhibition, he decided to present them chronologically according to the three-age system. Other scholars had previously proposed that prehistory had advanced from an age of stone tools, to ages of tools made from bronze and iron, but these proposals were presented as systems of evolution, which did not allow dating of artifacts. Thomsen refined the three-age system as a chronological system by seeing which artifacts occurred with which other artifacts in closed finds. In this way, he was the first to establish an evidence-based division of prehistory into discrete periods. This achievement led to his being credited as the originator of the three-age system of European antiquity.

Thomsen also wrote one of the first systematic treatises on gold bracteates of the Migration period. Thomsen's study of artifacts within the Copenhagen museum were based on associations between stylistic change, decoration and context; he recognised the importance of examining objects from "closed finds", allowing him to determine the associations of common artifacts for various periods (stone - bronze - iron). His results were published in the Ledetraad til Nordisk Oldkyndighed (Guideline to Nordic Antiquity) in 1836. An English translation was produced in 1848.

== Early life ==
Christian Jurgensen Thomsen was born in Copenhagen in 1788 into a wealthy merchant family. As a young man he visited Paris and once he had returned to Denmark, became interested in coin collecting. This may have helped him develop his awareness of stylistic change through time.

== Contributions to archaeology ==
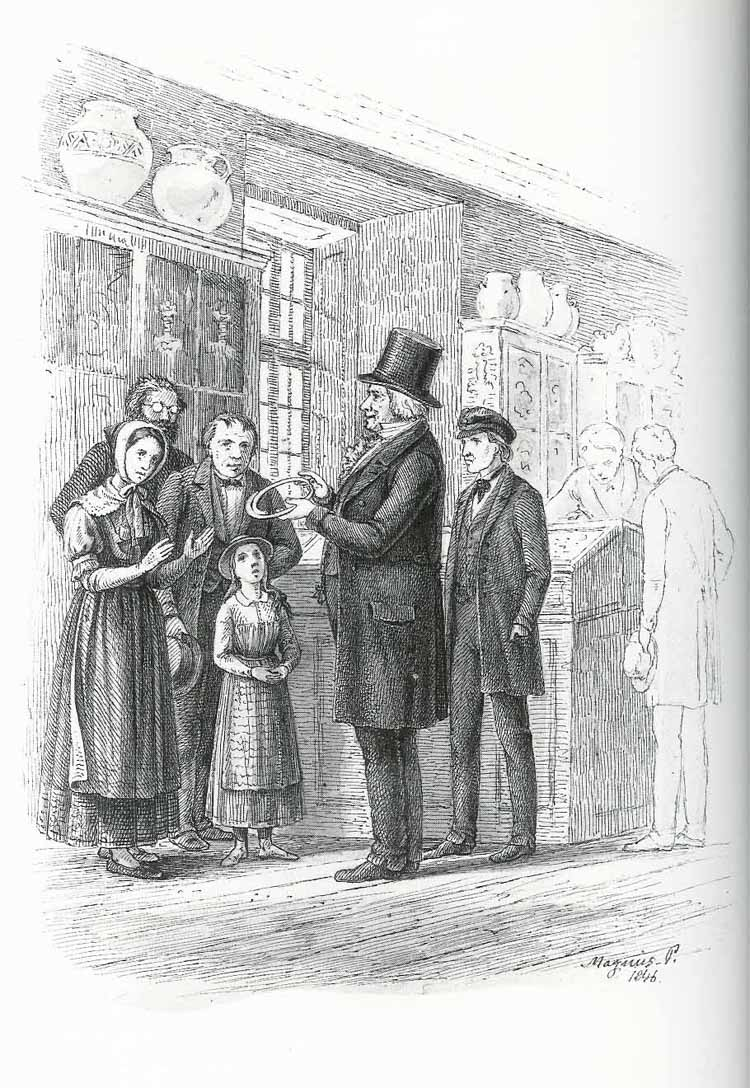
Thomsen showing visitors around the collection in 1848. Contemporary drawing.

In 1816 Thomsen was selected to curate Danish Royal Commission for the Collection and Preservation of Antiquities' first exhibition. As the post was unsalaried, Thomsen's independent means and his experience as a collector of coins were his primary qualifications.

He probably knew of the three-age model of prehistory through the works of Lucretius, Vedel Simonsen, Montfaucon and Mahudel, and decided to sort the material in the collection chronologically. Before Thomsen, this might have been done by mechanically sorting the materials according to their materials or the level of craftsmanship they displayed, but as the provenance of many of the materials were known, he could see that crude artifacts were sometimes found with fine ones and metal artifacts with artifacts of stone. Rather than take a simple technological or evolutionary approach, he realized that the task was to determine in which periods the artifacts had been made.

Thomsen decided to map out which kinds of phenomena co-occurred in deposits and which did not, as this would allow him to discern any trends that were exclusive to certain periods. In this way he discovered that stone tools were found in connection with amber, pottery, glass beads, whereas bronze was found with both iron and gold, but silver was only found in connection with iron. He also found that bronze weapons did not occur with iron artifacts - so that each period could be defined by its preferred cutting material. He also found that the types of grave goods varied between burial types: stone tools were found with uncremated corpses and stone-chamber tombs, bronze weapons and lurs in relation to stone-schist graves, and iron with chamber tombs in barrows. Thomsen was the first to use the terms Stone Age, Bronze Age and the Iron Age. When detractors asked rhetorically why there was no "glass age", Thomsen responded that glass beads were found in all three periods, but bowls of glass only in the Iron Age.

To Thomsen the find circumstances were the key to dating. As early as 1821, he wrote in a letter to fellow antiquarian Schröder that, "[n]othing is more important than to point out that hitherto we have not paid enough attention to what was found together," and, the next year, that "[we] still do not know enough about most of the antiquities either … only future archaeologists may be able to decide, but they will never be able to do so if they do not observe what things are found together and our collections are not brought to a greater degree of perfection."

This analysis emphasizing co-occurrence and systematic attention to archaeological context allowed Thomsen to build a chronological framework of the materials in the collection and to classify new finds in relation to the established chronology, even without much knowledge of its provenience. In this way, Thomsen's system was a true chronological system rather than an evolutionary or technological system. His chronology was established by 1825, and visitors to the museum were instructed in his methods. Thomsen also published journal articles and pamphlets in which he emphasized the importance of the find circumstances for later interpretation and dating. Finally, in 1836, he published the illustrated monograph Guide to Northern Antiquity, in which he described his chronology together with comments about which things occurred together in finds.

Like previous antiquarians, such as Winckelmann, Thomsen paid attention to stylistic analysis as well, but he used his chronological framework as evidence that stylistic developments had taken place, not the other way round. Thomsen may have been able to make his early advances in the development of archaeology because he had such a wide variety of material to review, consisting of collective finds from a large relatively homogeneous culture area. He was the first to develop it into a chronological system rather than a speculative evolutionary model.

Thomsen was an important influence on subsequent generations of prehistorians in Scandinavia, and he taught his methods to archaeologists such as J. J. A. Worsaae and Bror Emil Hildebrand and later Oscar Montelius. He also importantly influenced and was influenced by contemporary Swedish prehistorians such as Sven Nilsson.

Thomsen's Ledetraad til Nordisk Oldkyndighed (Guideline to Nordic Antiquity; 1836) was published in English in 1848. Worsaae's The Primeval Antiquities of Denmark was published in English in 1849; the two works were highly influential on the development of archaeology theory and practice in Great Britain and the United States.

In 1862, he was elected as a member of the American Philosophical Society.

== Influence on art ==
Together with Niels Laurits Høyen, Thomsen had great influence on the arts in Copenhagen. He was active as a board in the influential Kunstforeningen (Art Society) in the 1830s when its member numbers and position peaked. In 1839 he was appointed as inspector at the Royal Painting Collection alongside Niels Laurits Høyen. Many private collectors also consulted Thomsen.

== Bibliography ==
- Thomsen, C. J. (1836) Ledetraad til Nordisk Oldkundskab (Guideline to Nordic Antiquity), published in German in 1837 and in English in 1848.

== Sources ==
- Conn, Steven (2004). History's Shadow: Native Americans and Historical Consciousness in the Nineteenth Century, Chicago: University of Chicago Press.
- Gjerløff, Anne Katrine. (1999). "Syn for sagn: Dansk Arkæologi og Historie i 1800-tallet", Historisk Tidsskrift 99:2
- Gräslund, Bo. (1987) The Birth of Prehistoric Chronology. Dating methods and dating systems in nineteenth-century Scandinavian archeology, Cambridge University Press.
- Heizer, Robert. (1962). "The background of Thomsen's Three-age System", Technology and Culture, Vol. 3, No. 3
- Rowley-Conwy, Peter. (2006). "The Concept of Prehistory and the Invention of the Terms `Prehistoric' and `Prehistorian': the Scandinavian Origin, 1833—1850", European Journal of Archaeology 9:1 pp. 103–130
- Trigger, Bruce (2006). A History of Archaeological thought (2 ed.). Cambridge University Press.
- Worsaae, J. J. A. (1866) "Carl Christian Rafn og C.J. Thomsen", in Aarbøger for nordisk Oldkyndighed

Cultural offices
Preceded by none	Director of the National Museum of Denmark; 1825–1865	Succeeded by Jens Jacob Asmussen Worsaae
