= Jens Jacob Asmussen Worsaae =

Danish archaeologist, historian and politician (1821–1885)

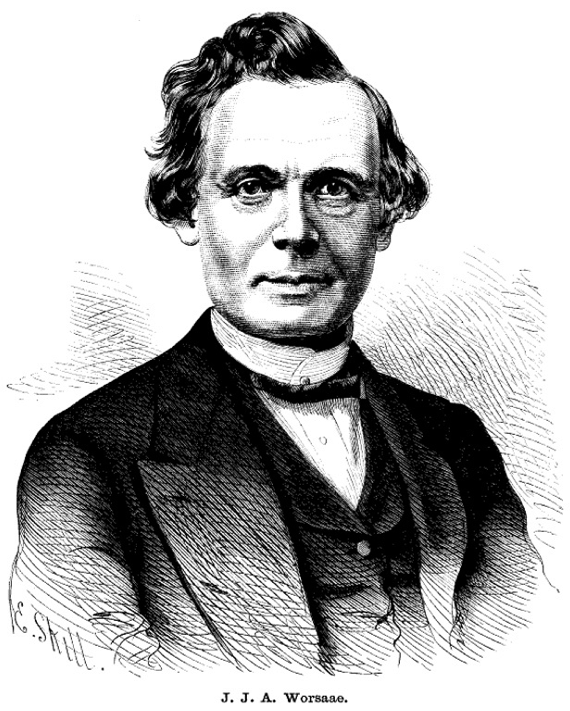
- Jens Jacob Asmussen Worsaae
- Born: 14 March 1821; Vejle, Denmark
- Died: 15 August 1885 (aged 64); Copenhagen, Denmark
- Resting place: Cemetery of Holmen
- Scientific career
- Fields: Archaeologist
- Workplaces: National Museum of Denmark

Jens Jacob Asmussen Worsaae (14 March 1821 – 15 August 1885) was a Danish archaeologist, historian and politician, who was the second director of the National Museum of Denmark (1865–1874). He played a key role in the foundation of scientific archaeology. Worsaae was the first to excavate and use stratigraphy to prove C. J. Thomsen's sequence of the Three-age system: Stone, Bronze, Iron. He was also a pioneer in the development of paleobotany through his excavation work in the peat bogs of Jutland. Worsaae served as Kultus Minister of Denmark (the cultural and education minister) for Christen Andreas Fonnesbech from 1874 to 1875.

== Early life and education ==
Jens Jacob Asmussen Worsaae was born in Vejle, Denmark in 1821. He was the fifth of eleven children born into a wealthy, educated family. His father was a civil servant (a county treasurer) for the County of Vejle and also a member of the Royal Society of Northern Antiquities.

Worsaae's archaeological interests began in 1832 when his father gave him two stone axes, one which had been found on his land and the other having been found in the dredging of Vejle harbour. Worsaae was inspired; he began to search in on the east coast of Jutland before expanding his search area to include central and southern Jutland as well.

In 1835 whilst at school in Randers, Worsaae was invited to participate in an excavation of a grave at Bygholm, outside Horsens. Worsaae was also included in excavations near Jellinge the following year.

In 1838 he started studies at the University of Copenhagen, graduating in 1841.

== Career and contributions ==
While in Copenhagen for college, Worsaae began to work as a volunteer with Christian Jürgensen Thomsen, the first director of the National Museum of Denmark. He learned Thomsen's methods of dating artifacts and controlled archaeological excavation.

Not wanting to continue working without pay, he found a patron in King Christian VIII. At the king's request, Worsaae wrote an overview of the antiquarian field: The Primeval Antiquities of Denmark (Danmarks Oldtid oplyst ved Oldsager og Gravhøie), which explicated archaeology and the three-age system, was first published in 1843 in Denmark, and became widely popular. More than Thomsen, Worsaae reacted against the then-prevalent view of prehistory in Denmark. The historian Suhm identified the proto-historic period as the "legendary age". He thought it could be studied from the Old Norse myths and legends. Suhm interpreted Norse gods and mythical figures as the kings and leaders of prehistoric peoples. Worsaae rejected this view of prehistory as euhemerism. He thought that prehistory was a period best studied not by historians, but by archeologists, who dealt with material goods. He believed that the knowledge that can be obtained about prehistory will necessarily be qualitatively different from the knowledge of historic periods, based on written texts.

Worsaae was working in a context of nationalist striving. In the mid-19th century, amid Danish-German political tension, the Norwegian scholar and nationalist Peter Andreas Munch provided the Germans with arguments for invading Denmark by suggesting that Denmark had originally been settled by Germans. But, Worsaae argued that the prehistoric peoples of the archaeological records could not be identified with any modern peoples because of the sheer timescale involved. Still, his work on Danish antiquities was taken to mean that natives had a long history in the area.

Similarly, when the Haraldskær Woman, a peat-bog mummy was found in southern Denmark in 1843, she was exhibited as the legendary Queen Gunhild of the early Mediaeval period. Worsaae disputed this view, arguing that the body was Iron Age in origin, like most from the bogs, and predated any historical persons of the chronicles by at least 500 years.

King Christian sent him on a research trip to Britain and Ireland in 1846 and 1847, to study evidence of Vikings. He did research into antiquities and histories to develop an account of the culture around the North Sea. Worsaae wrote An Account of the Danes and the Norsemen in England, Scotland and Ireland (1852).

In 1847 Worsaae was appointed the Inspector for the Conservation of Antiquarian Monuments. He worked to preserve areas and directed excavations across the country. By controlled excavation and analysis of stratigraphy, he found artifacts that supported Thomsen's Three-Age System, formerly based on the museum collection. Using Nilsson's studies of prehistoric subsistence and the Danish geologist Johannes Japetus Steenstrup's studies of changes in prehistoric forestation, Worsaae began to explore the limits of what can be known about prehistory. In that period of scholarship, those who could grasp the concept of prehistory were hard pressed to imagine that cultural developments could be discerned within the three ages. Through excavations of stone-age sites, Worsaae saw that there were distinct trends of coöccurrence: a period with simple tools, signs of hunting and fishing, and with dog bones as the only evidence of domestic animals. This period was associated with the discovery of "kitchen middens": enormous piles of waste produced by oyster-eating foragers. The middens were sometimes as large as ten meters high and a hundred meters long. Worsaae commented in his diary that "these enormous piles of oyster shells must represent the remains of meals eaten by stone age people".

Worsaae determined that a second subset of the Stone Age deposits, associated with dolmen burials, showed signs of animal husbandry and agriculture. Following Nilsson's analyses of prehistoric subsistence, Worsaae proposed that the Stone Age had a foraging period and an agricultural period, which could be demonstrated from artifacts. He also recognized that finds from caves in France predated even the Danish foraging stone-age period. He was perhaps the first to envision what became the division between Paleolithic, Mesolithic and Neolithic periods. These were classified and named by the British researcher John Lubbock, 1st Baron Avebury in 1865.

As director of the National Museum of Denmark (1865–1874), Worsaae became the mentor of a new generation of archaeologists: including Sophus Müller in Denmark. He was also a professor at the university. He supported archaeology as a science and influenced its study and excavation practices. He also influenced archaeologists in Sweden, where Nils G. Bruzelius, Hans Hildebrand and Oscar Montelius followed his lead. They further developed methods for establishing chronologies through controlled excavations. It was during his directorship of the National Museum that Worsaae's large collection of antiquities from Denmark was purchased by the British Museum.

Worsaae's early work The Primeval Antiquities of Denmark (Danmarks Oldtid oplyst ved Oldsager og Gravhøie), which explicated the three-age system, was first published in 1843 in Denmark, and in English in 1849. It strongly influenced researchers in Great Britain and the United States. For instance, Lewis Henry Morgan, a pioneering American ethnologist, developed his own three-stage system of prehistory in his book, Ancient Society (1877). He theorized that prehistoric peoples went through progressive stages of "savagery", "barbarism" and "civilization", to be traced by several criteria, including their kinship and social structures, as well as tools and cultivation.

Worsaae was elected as a member of the American Philosophical Society in 1869.

== Personal life ==
Worsaae married Severine Jacobine Grevencop-Castenschiold, a member of the prominent Grevencop-Castenschiold family. They had two daughters: Jacobine Cathrine Margrethe Worsaae (1869–1951), the elder of the two, married the politician and Governor of the Danish West Indies Henri Konow. Her younger sister, Caroline "Lilli" Alvilda Nini Worsaae, died when she was just 22 years old.

Worsaae and his wife lived on his father-in-law's estate Hagestedgaard for extended periods of time. He died there in 1885.

== Works ==
- Primeval Antiquities of Denmark. translated by William John Thoms (1849)
- An account of the Danes and Norwegians in England, Scotland, and Ireland (1852)
- The industrial arts of Denmark: from the earliest times to the Danish conquest of England (1882)
- The Pre-history of the North: Based on Contemporary Memorials (1886) translated by H. F. Morland Simpson

== See also ==
- Stratification (archeology)

== Sources ==
- Gjerløff, Anne Katrine. (1999) "Syn for sagn: Dansk Arkæologi og Historie i 1800-tallet", Historisk Tidsskrift 99:2
- Gräslund, Bo. (1987) The Birth of Prehistoric Chronology. Dating Methods and Dating Systems in Nineteenth-Century Scandinavian Archeology, Cambridge University Press.
- Hermansen, V. (1934) En Oldgranskers Erindringer, København.
- Rowley-Conwy, Peter. (2006) "The Concept of Prehistory and the Invention of the Terms 'Prehistoric' and 'Prehistorian': the Scandinavian Origin, 1833–1850", European Journal of Archaeology 9:1 pp. 103–130

Cultural offices
Preceded by Christian Jürgensen Thomsen	Director of the National Museum of Denmark; 1865–1874	Succeeded by ?
Political offices
Preceded by Carl Christian Hall	Kultus Minister of Denmark; 14 July 1874 – 11 June 1875	Succeeded by Johan Christian Henrik Fischer
