= Nicolas Mahudel =

Nicolas Mahudel (21 November 1673 – 7 March 1747) was a French antiquary interested in prehistoric research. He proposed the chronological prehistoric sequence Stone Age - Bronze Age - Iron Age. Mahudel was for a time a Jesuit and later in his life a Trappist.

Nicolas Mahudel was born on 21 November 1673 in Langres. He died on 7 March 1747 in Paris.

With his work Three Successive Ages of Stone, Bronze, and Iron (1734), he influenced fellow antiquaries, notably William Borlase who further developed this idea.

During the 18th century still, controversy was vivid as to whether thunder-stones had been made by men or were actually fossils. Mahudel, member of the Académie des Inscriptions, presented several of those stones and showed that they have evidently been cut by the hand of man. "An examination of them," he said, "affords a proof of the efforts of our earliest ancestors to provide for their wants, and to obtain the necessaries of life."

He established the stone - bronze - iron sequence after he had compared several burial sites. He noticed that graves with decayed urns largely featured bronze items, whereas iron was found in more recent ones.
