= Family =

Group of related people

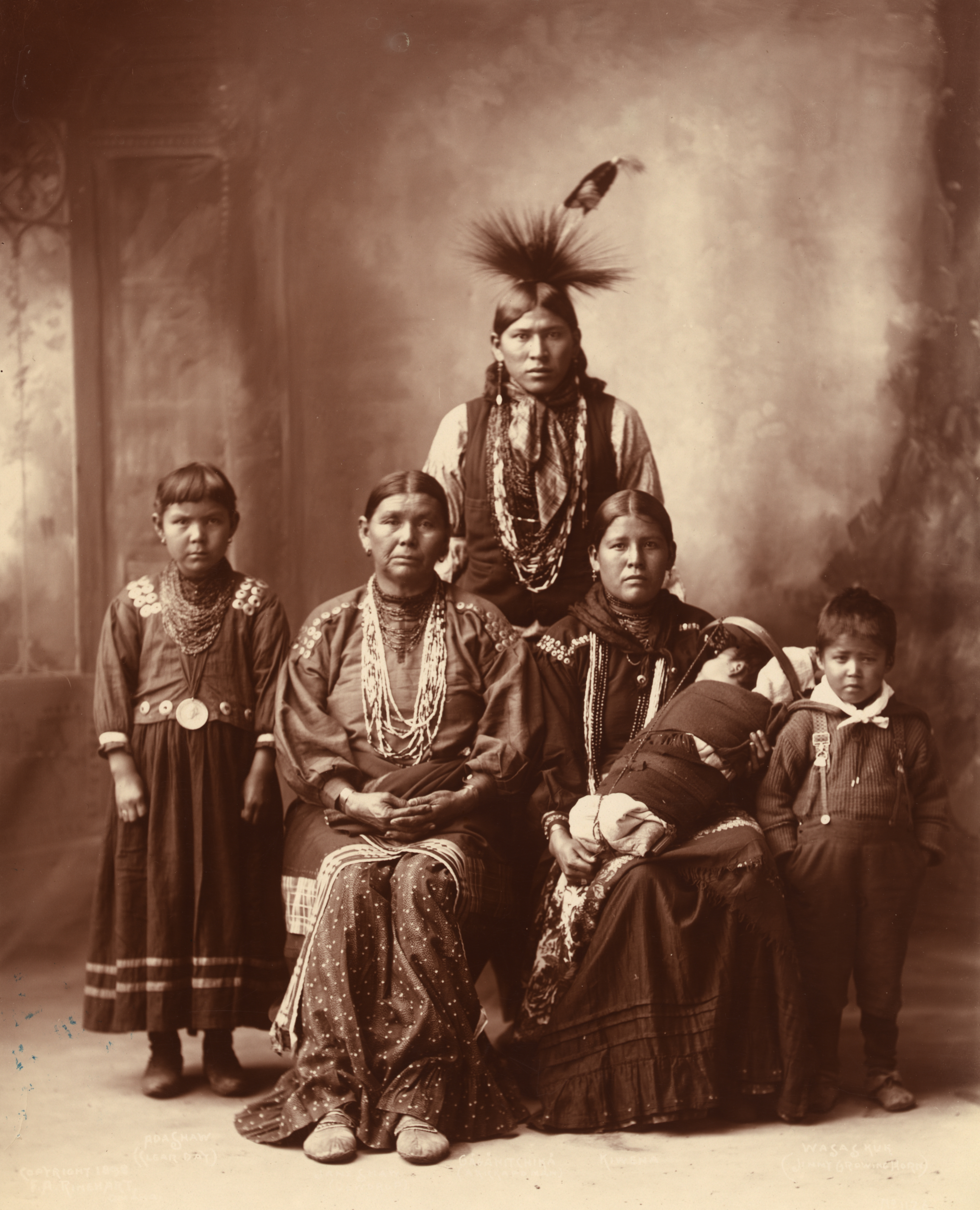
Sauk family photographed by Frank Rinehart in 1899

Family (from Latin: familia) is a group of people related either by consanguinity (by recognized birth) or affinity (by marriage or other relationship). It forms the basis for social order. Ideally, families offer predictability, structure, and safety as members mature and learn to participate in the community. Historically, most human societies use family as the primary purpose of attachment, nurturance, and socialization.

Anthropologists classify most family organizations as matrifocal (a mother and her children), patrifocal (a father and his children), conjugal (a married couple with children, also called the nuclear family), avuncular (a man, his sister, and her children), or extended (in addition to parents, spouse and children, may include grandparents, aunts, uncles, or cousins).

The field of genealogy aims to trace family lineages through history. The family is also an important economic unit studied in family economics. The word "families" can be used metaphorically to create more inclusive categories such as community, nationhood, and global village.

== Social ==
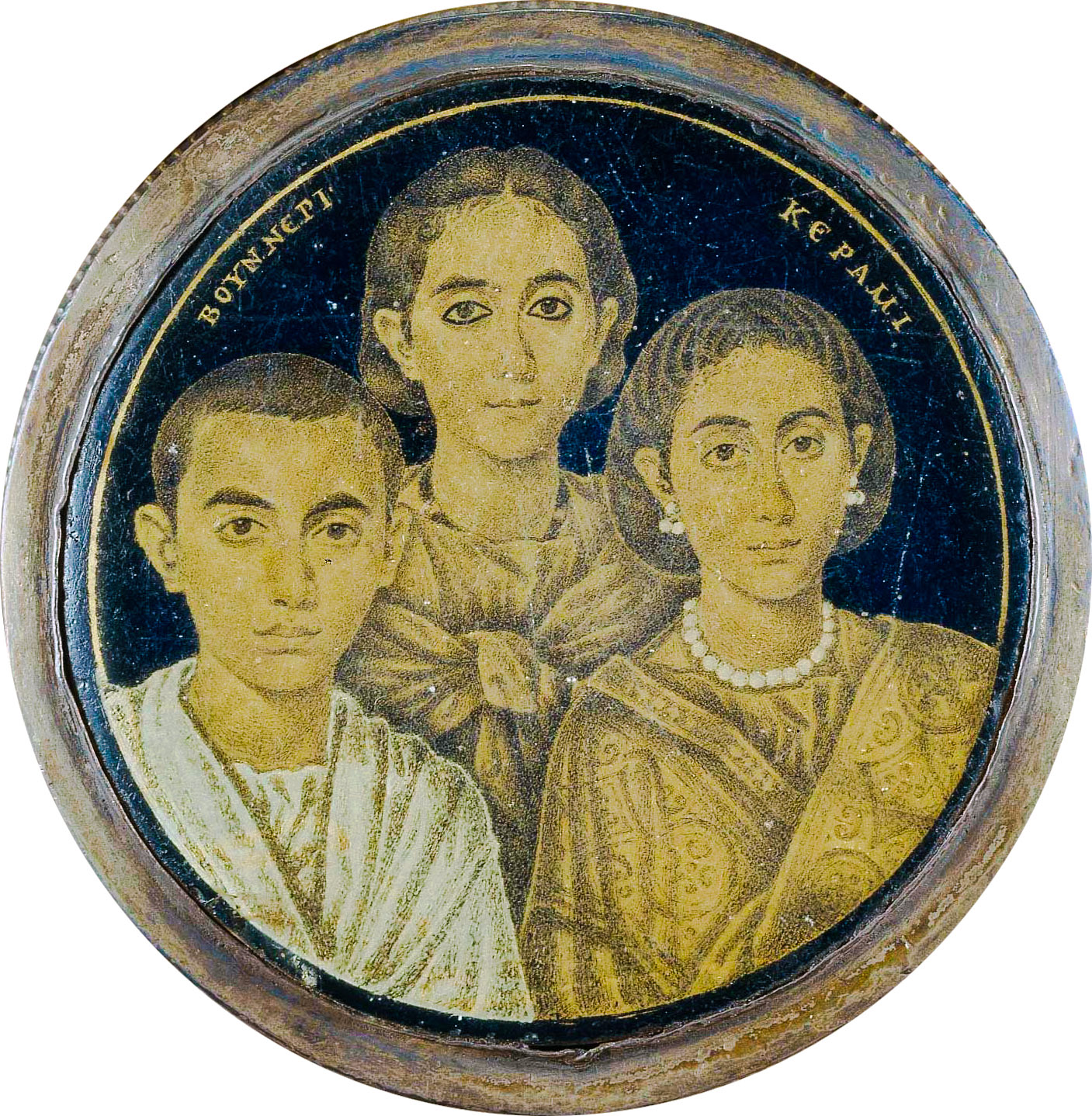
Detail of a gold glass medallion with a portrait of a family, from Alexandria (Roman Egypt), 3rd–4th century (Brescia, Museo di Santa Giulia)

One of the primary functions of the family involves providing a framework for the production and reproduction of persons biologically and socially. This can occur through the sharing of material substances (such as food); the giving and receiving of care and nurture (nurture kinship); jural rights and obligations; also moral and sentimental ties. Thus, one's experience of one's family shifts over time.

There are different perspectives of the term 'family', from the perspective of children, the family is a "family of orientation": the family serves to locate children socially and plays a major role in their enculturation and socialization. From the point of view of the parent(s), the family is a "family of procreation", the goal of which is to produce, enculturate and socialize children. However, producing children is not the only function of the family; in societies with a sexual division of labor, marriage, and the resulting relationship between two people, it is necessary for the formation of an economically productive household.

C. C. Harris notes that the western conception of a family is ambiguous and confused with the household, as revealed in the different contexts in which the word is used. Olivia Harris states this confusion is not accidental, but indicative of the familial ideology of capitalist, western countries that pass social legislation that insists members of a nuclear family should live together, and that those not so related should not live together. Despite the ideological and legal pressures, most households do not conform to the ideal nuclear family type. Powell, Bolzendahl, Geist, and Steelman asked Americans who counts as family among 11 different household structures, and found a wide variety of responses depending on how people defined the family. Some respondents had a limited definition of family, only including heterosexual married couples (and their children) as family. Others considered that simply the presence of children signified a family. A third group required that it "feel and function like a family," regardless of the structure.

=== Size ===
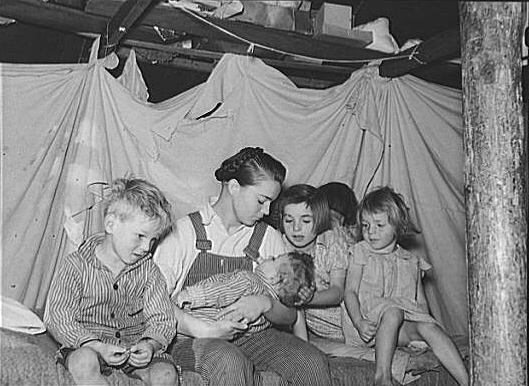
Mennonite siblings, Montana, United States, 1937

The total fertility rate of women varies from country to country, from a high rate of 6.76 children born per woman in Niger to a low rate of 0.81 in Singapore (as of 2015). Fertility is below replacement in all Eastern European and Southern European countries, and particularly high in Sub-Saharan African countries.

In some cultures, the mother's preference of family size influences that of the children's through early adulthood. A parent's number of children strongly correlates with the number of children that their children will eventually have.

== Types ==
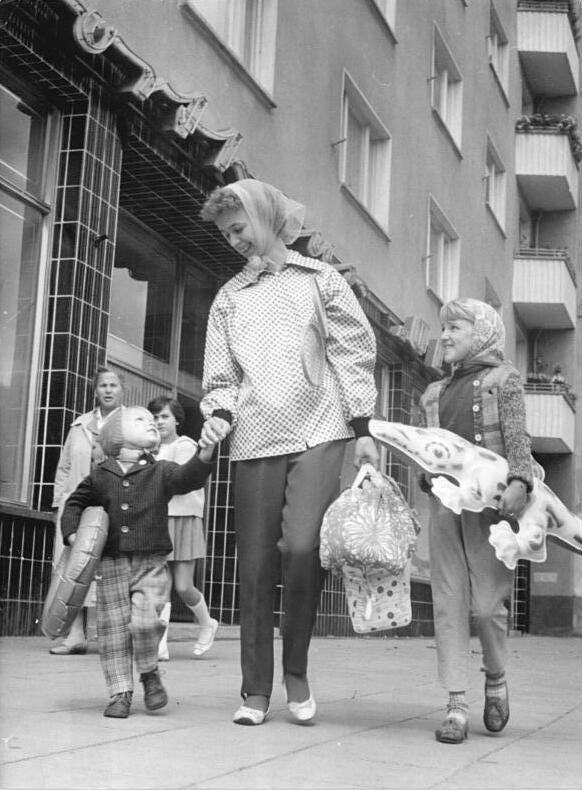
A German mother with her children in the 1960s

Although early western cultural anthropologists and sociologists considered family and kinship to be universally associated with relations by "blood" (based on ideas common in their own cultures) later research has shown that many societies instead understand family through ideas of living together, the sharing of food (e.g. milk kinship) and sharing care and nurture. Sociologists have a special interest in the function and status of family forms in stratified (especially capitalist) societies.

According to the work of scholars Max Weber, Alan Macfarlane, Steven Ozment, Jack Goody and Peter Laslett, the huge transformation that led to modern marriage in Western democracies was "fueled by the religio-cultural value system provided by elements of Judaism, early Christianity, Roman Catholic canon law and the Protestant Reformation".

Much sociological, historical and anthropological research dedicates itself to the understanding of this variation, and of changes in the family that form over time. Levitan claims:

Times have changed; it is more acceptable and encouraged for mothers to work and fathers to spend more time at home with the children. The way roles are balanced between the parents will help children grow and learn valuable life lessons. There is [the] great importance of communication and equality in families, in order to avoid role strain.

Nonetheless, the results of Steven Ruggles' assessment of world census data suggest "nineteenth-century Northwest Europe and North America did not have exceptionally simple or nuclear family structure."

=== Multigenerational family ===
Historically, the most common family type was one in which grandparents, parents, and children lived together as a single unit. For example, the household might include the owners of a farm, one (or more) of their adult children, the adult child's spouse, and the adult child's own children (the owners' grandchildren). Members of the extended family are not included in this family group. Sometimes, "skipped" generation families, such as a grandparents living with their grandchildren, are included.

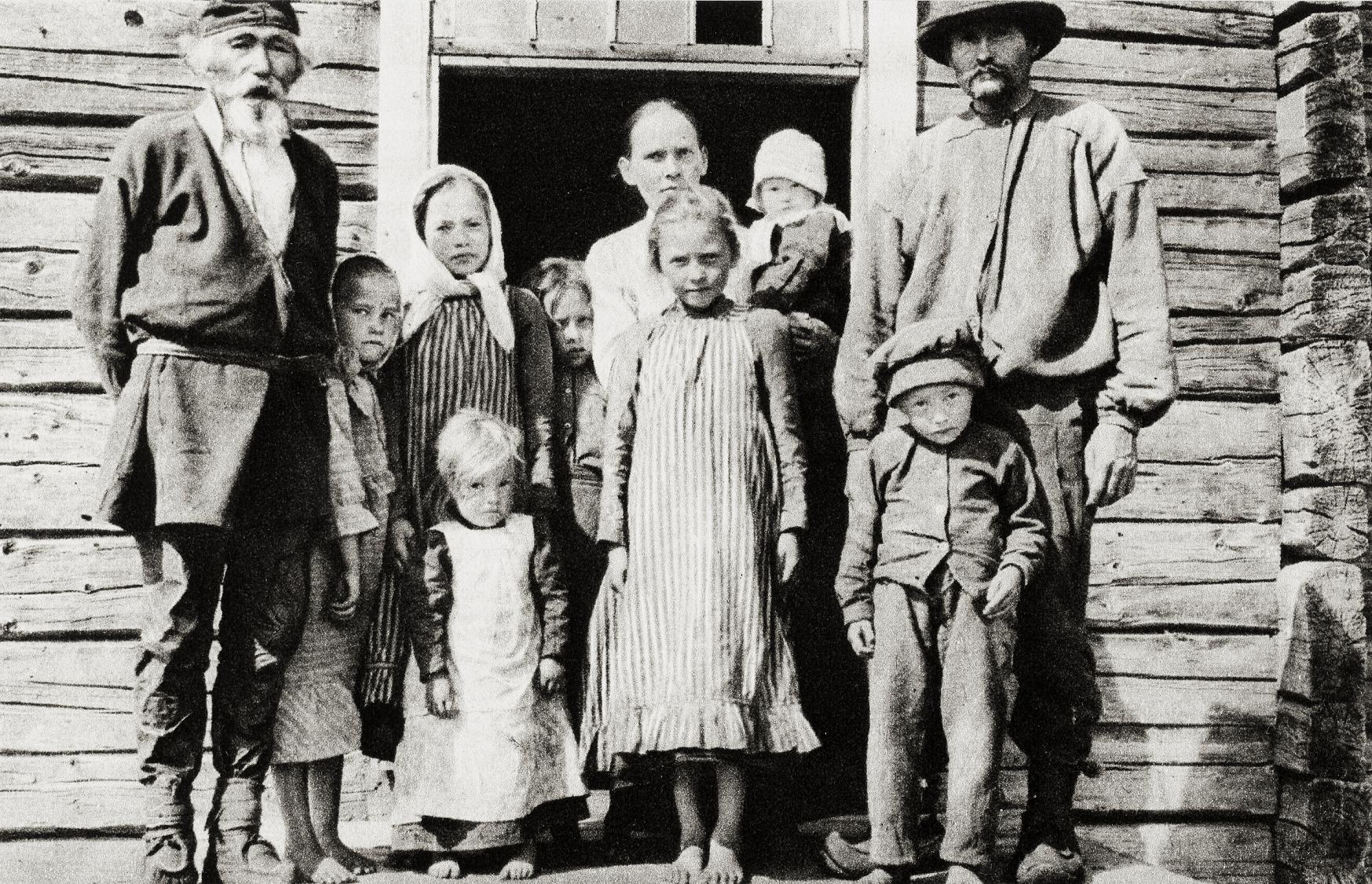
Settled Sami (Lapplander) family of farmers in Stensele, Västerbotten, Sweden, early 20th century

In the US, this arrangement declined after World War II, reaching a low point in 1980, when about one out of every eight people in the US lived in a multigenerational family. The numbers have risen since then, with one in five people in the US living in a multigenerational family as of 2016. The increasing popularity is partly driven by demographic changes and the economic shifts associated with the Boomerang Generation.

Multigenerational households are less common in Canada, where about 6% of people living in Canada were living in multigenerational families as of 2016, but the proportion of multigenerational households was increasing rapidly, driven by increasing numbers of Aboriginal families, immigrant families, and high housing costs in some regions.

=== Conjugal (nuclear) family ===
The term "nuclear family" is commonly used to refer to conjugal families. A "conjugal" family includes only the spouses and unmarried children who are not of age. Some sociologists distinguish between conjugal families (relatively independent of the kindred of the parents and of other families in general) and nuclear families (which maintain relatively close ties with their kindred).

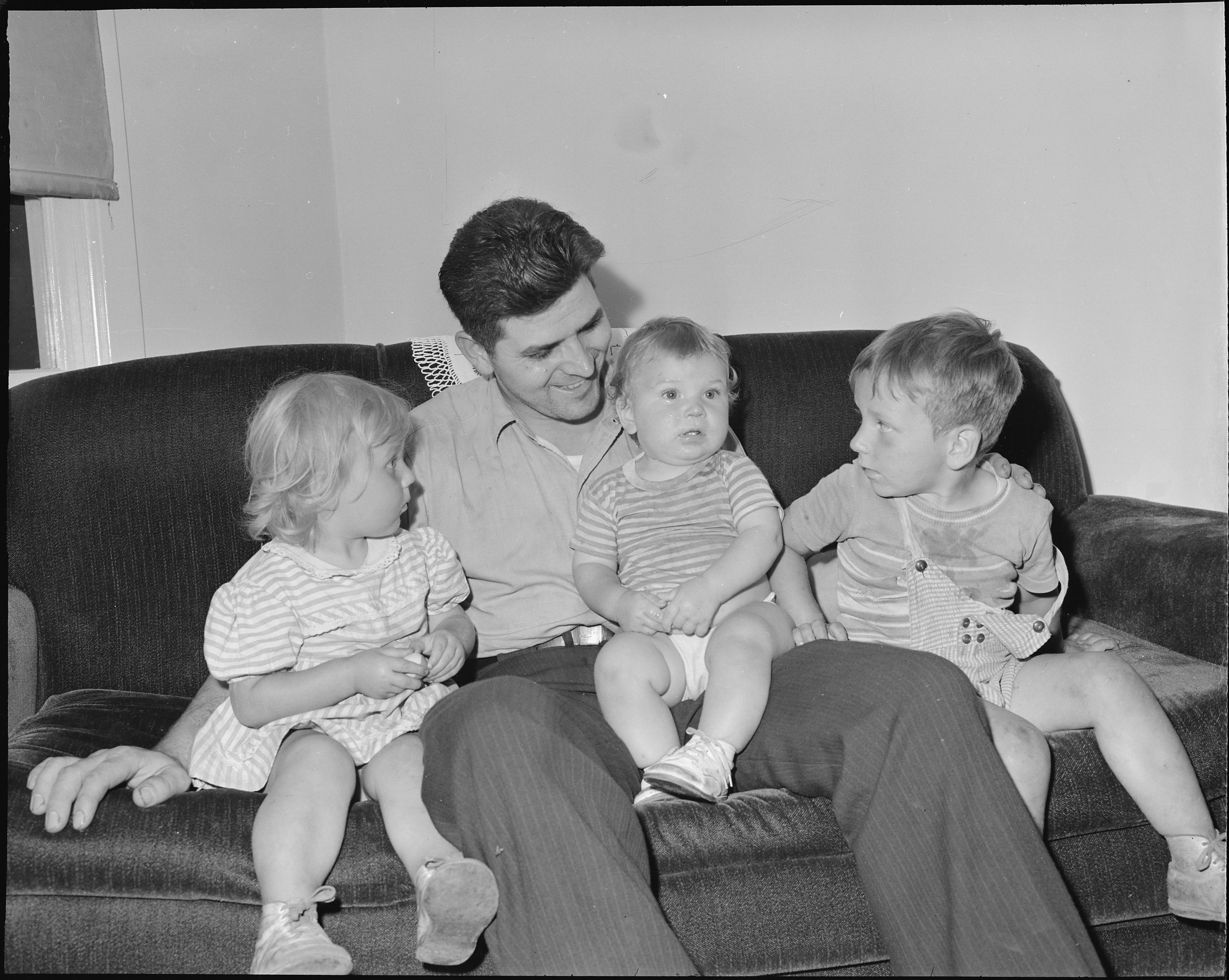
A father with his children in the United States in the 1940s

Other family structures – with (for example) blended parents, single parents, and domestic partnerships – have begun to challenge the normality of the nuclear family.

=== Single-parent family ===
A single-parent family consists of one parent together with their children, where the parent is either widowed, divorced (and not remarried), or never married. The parent may have sole custody of the children, or separated parents may have a shared-parenting arrangement where the children divide their time (possibly equally) between two different single-parent families or between one single-parent family and one blended family. As compared to sole custody, physical, mental and social well-being of children may be improved by shared-parenting arrangements and by children having greater access to both parents. The number of single-parent families have been increasing due to the divorce rate climbing drastically during the years 1965–1995, and about half of all children in the United States will live in a single-parent family at some point before they reach the age of 18. Most single-parent families are headed by a mother, but the number of single-parent families headed by fathers is increasing.

=== Matrifocal family ===
A "matrifocal" family consists of a mother and her children. Generally, these children are her biological offspring, although adoption of children occurs in nearly every society. This kind of family occurs commonly where women have the resources to rear their children by themselves, or where men are more mobile than women. As a definition, "a family or domestic group is matrifocal when it is centred on a woman and her children. In this case, the father(s) of these children are intermittently present in the life of the group and occupy a secondary place. The children's mother is not necessarily the wife of one of the children's fathers." The name, matrifocal, was coined in Guiana but it is defined differently in other countries. For Nayar families, the family have the male as the "center" or the head of the family, either the step-father/father/brother, rather than the mother.

=== Extended family ===
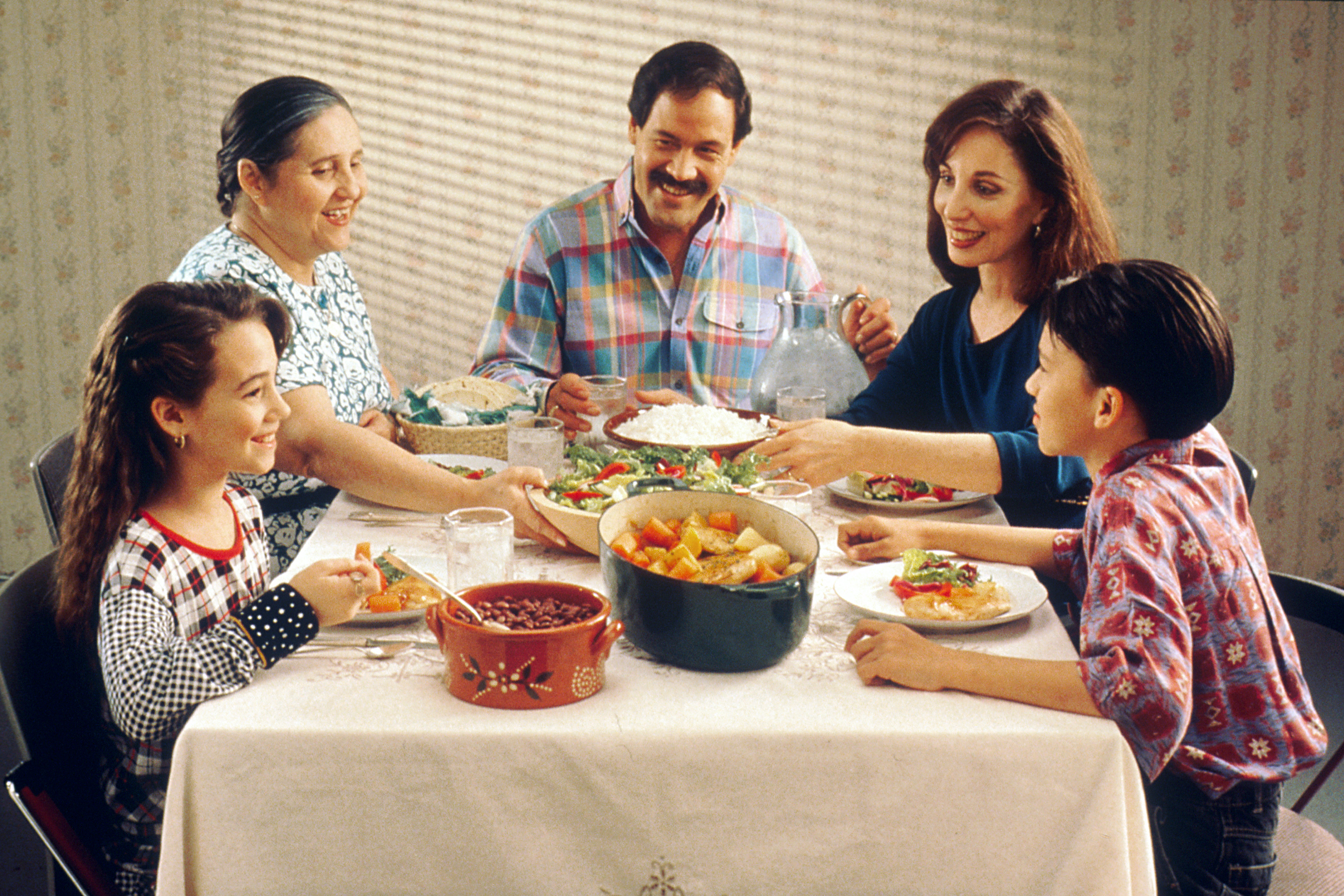
Hispanic family eating a meal

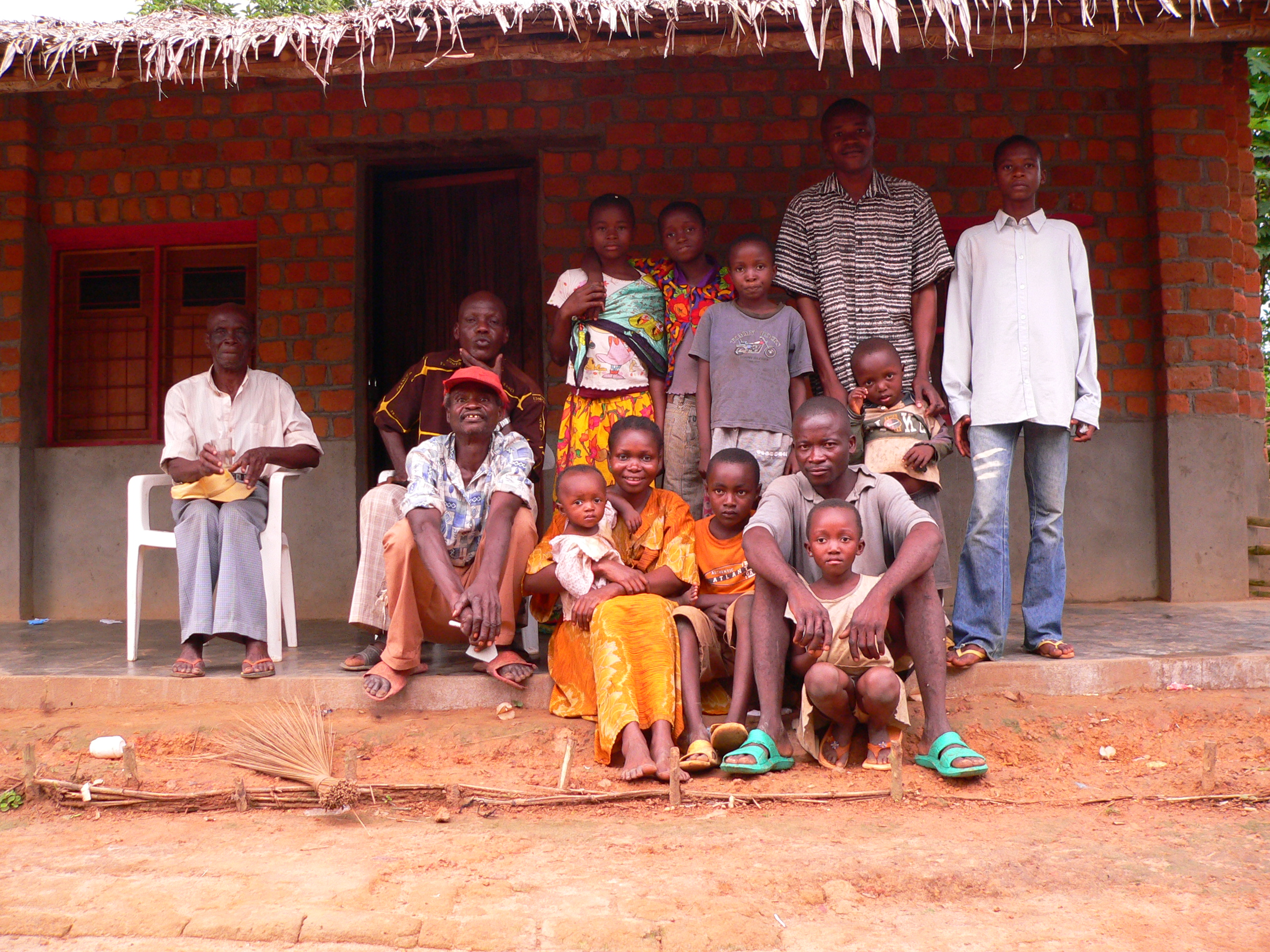
A family from Basankusu, Democratic Republic of the Congo

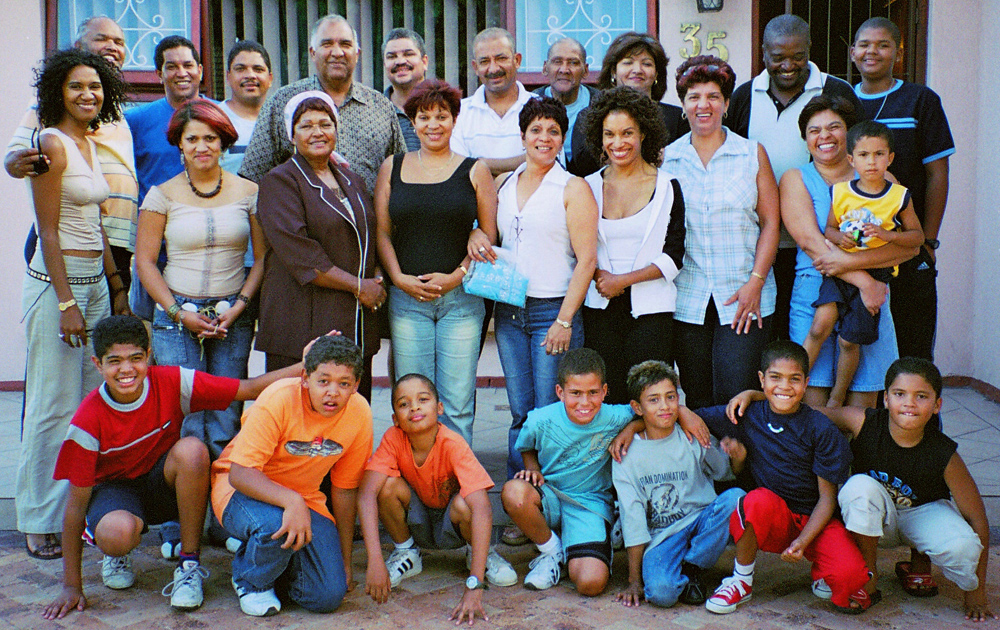
Extended family with roots in Cape Town, Kimberley and Pretoria, South Africa

The term "extended family" is also common, especially in the United States. This term has two distinct meanings:

1. It serves as a synonym of "consanguineal family" (consanguine means "of the same blood").
2. In societies dominated by the conjugal family, it refers to "kindred" (an egocentric network of relatives that extends beyond the domestic group) who do not belong to the conjugal family.

These types refer to ideal or normative structures found in particular societies. Any society will exhibit some variation in the actual composition and conception of families.

Historically, extended families were the basic family unit in the Catholic culture and countries (such as Southern Europe and Latin America), and in Asian, Middle Eastern and Eastern Orthodox countries.

=== Family of choice ===
The term family of choice, also sometimes referred to as "chosen family" or "found family", is common within the LGBT community, veterans, individuals who have suffered abuse, and those who have no contact with their biological parents. It refers to the group of people in an individual's life that satisfies the typical role of family as a support system. The term differentiates between the "family of origin" (the biological family or that in which people are raised) and those that actively assume that ideal role.

The family of choice may or may not include some or all of the members of the family of origin. This family is not one that follows the "normal" familial structure like having a father, a mother, and children. This is family as a group of people that rely on each other like a family of origin would. This terminology stems from the fact that many LGBT individuals, upon coming out, face rejection or shame from the families they were raised in. The term family of choice is also used by individuals in the 12 step communities, who create close-knit "family" ties through the recovery process.

As a family system, families of choice face unique issues. Without legal safeguards, families of choice may struggle when medical, educational or governmental institutions fail to recognize their legitimacy. If members of the chosen family have been disowned by their family of origin, they may experience surrogate grief, displacing anger, loss, or anxious attachment onto their new family.

=== Blended family ===
The term blended family or stepfamily describes families with mixed parents: one or both parents remarried, bringing children of the former family into the new family. Also in sociology, particularly in the works of social psychologist Michael Lamb, traditional family refers to "a middle-class family with a bread-winning father and a stay-at-home mother, married to each other and raising their biological children," and nontraditional to exceptions to this rule. Most of the US households are now non-traditional under this definition. Critics of the term "traditional family" point out that in most cultures and at most times, the extended family model has been most common, not the nuclear family, though it has had a longer tradition in England than in other parts of Europe and Asia which contributed large numbers of immigrants to the Americas. The nuclear family became the most common form in the U.S. in the 1960s and 1970s.

In terms of communication patterns in families, there are a certain set of beliefs within the family that reflect how its members should communicate and interact. These family communication patterns arise from two underlying sets of beliefs. One being conversation orientation (the degree to which the importance of communication is valued) and two, conformity orientation (the degree to which families should emphasize similarities or differences regarding attitudes, beliefs, and values).

Blended families is complex, ranging from stepfamilies to cohabitating families (an individual living with guardians who are not married with step or half siblings). While it is not too different from stepfamilies, cohabiting families pose a prevalent psychological effect on youths. Some adolescents would be prone to "acts of delinquency," and experiencing problems in school ranging from a decrease in academic performance to increased problematic behavior. It coincides with other researches on the trajectories of stepfamilies where some experienced familyhood, but others lacking connection. Emotional detachment from members within stepfamilies contributes to this uncertainty, furthering the tension that these families may establish. The transition from an old family to a new family that falls under blended families would also become problematic as the activities that were once performed in the old family may not transfer well within the new family for adolescents.

=== Monogamous family ===
A monogamous family is based on a legal or social monogamy. In this case, an individual has only one (official) partner during their lifetime or at any one time (i.e. serial monogamy). This means that a person may not have several different legal spouses at the same time, as this is usually prohibited by bigamy laws, (the act of entering into a marriage with one person while still legally married to another) in jurisdictions that require monogamous marriages.

=== Polygamous family ===
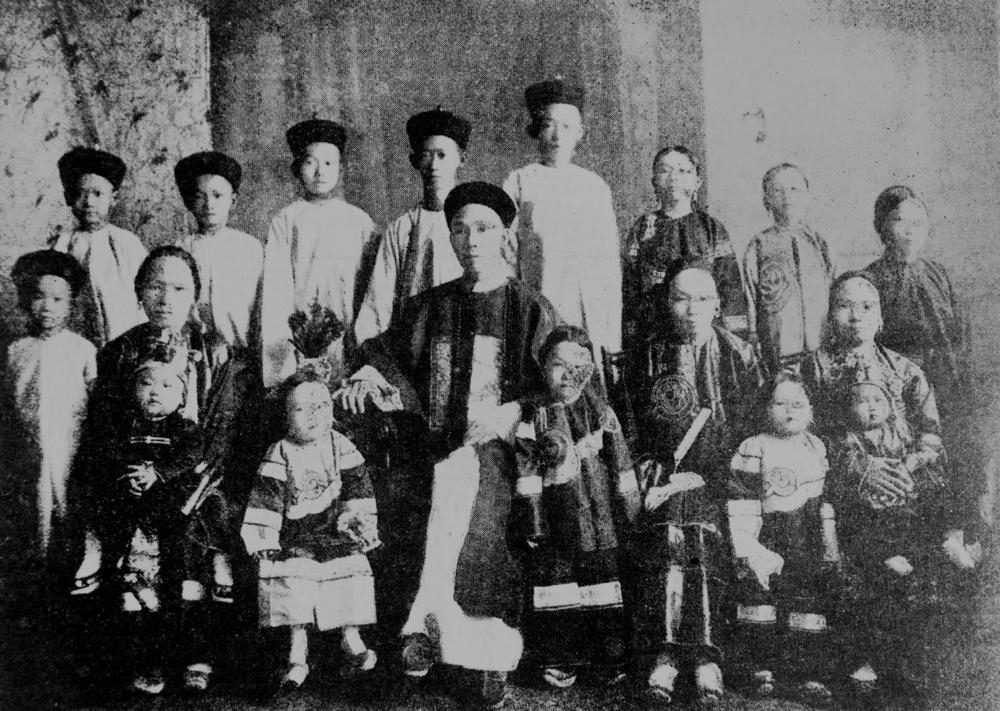
Chinese immigrant with his three wives and fourteen children, Cairns, Australia, 1904

Polygamy is a marriage that includes more than two partners. When a man is married to more than one wife at a time, the relationship is called polygyny; and when a woman is married to more than one husband at a time, it is called polyandry. If a marriage includes multiple husbands and wives, it can be called polyamory, group or conjoint marriage.

Polygyny is a form of plural marriage, in which a man is allowed more than one wife. In modern countries that permit polygamy, polygyny is typically the only form permitted. Polygyny is practiced primarily (but not only) in parts of the Middle East and Africa; and is often associated with Islam, however, there are certain conditions in Islam that must be met to perform polygyny. It is mostly associated with wealthy families, with some kings who have married many wives.

Polyandry is a form of marriage whereby a woman takes two or more husbands at the same time. Fraternal polyandry, where two or more brothers are married to the same wife, is a common form of polyandry. Polyandry was traditionally practiced in areas of the Himalayan mountains, among Tibetans in Nepal, in parts of China and in parts of northern India. Polyandry is most common in societies marked by high male mortality or where males will often be apart from the rest of the family for a considerable period of time.

== Kinship terminology ==
=== Degrees of kinship ===
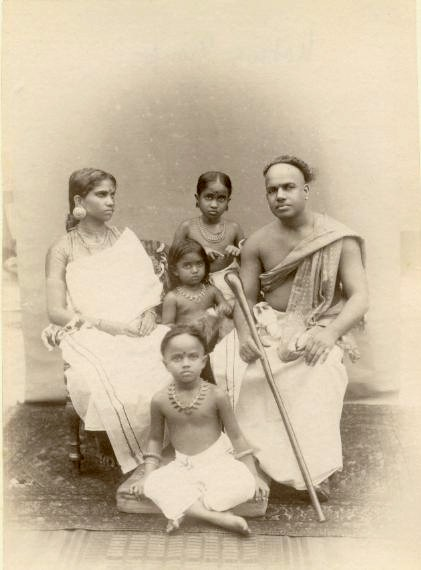
Family in India, 1870s

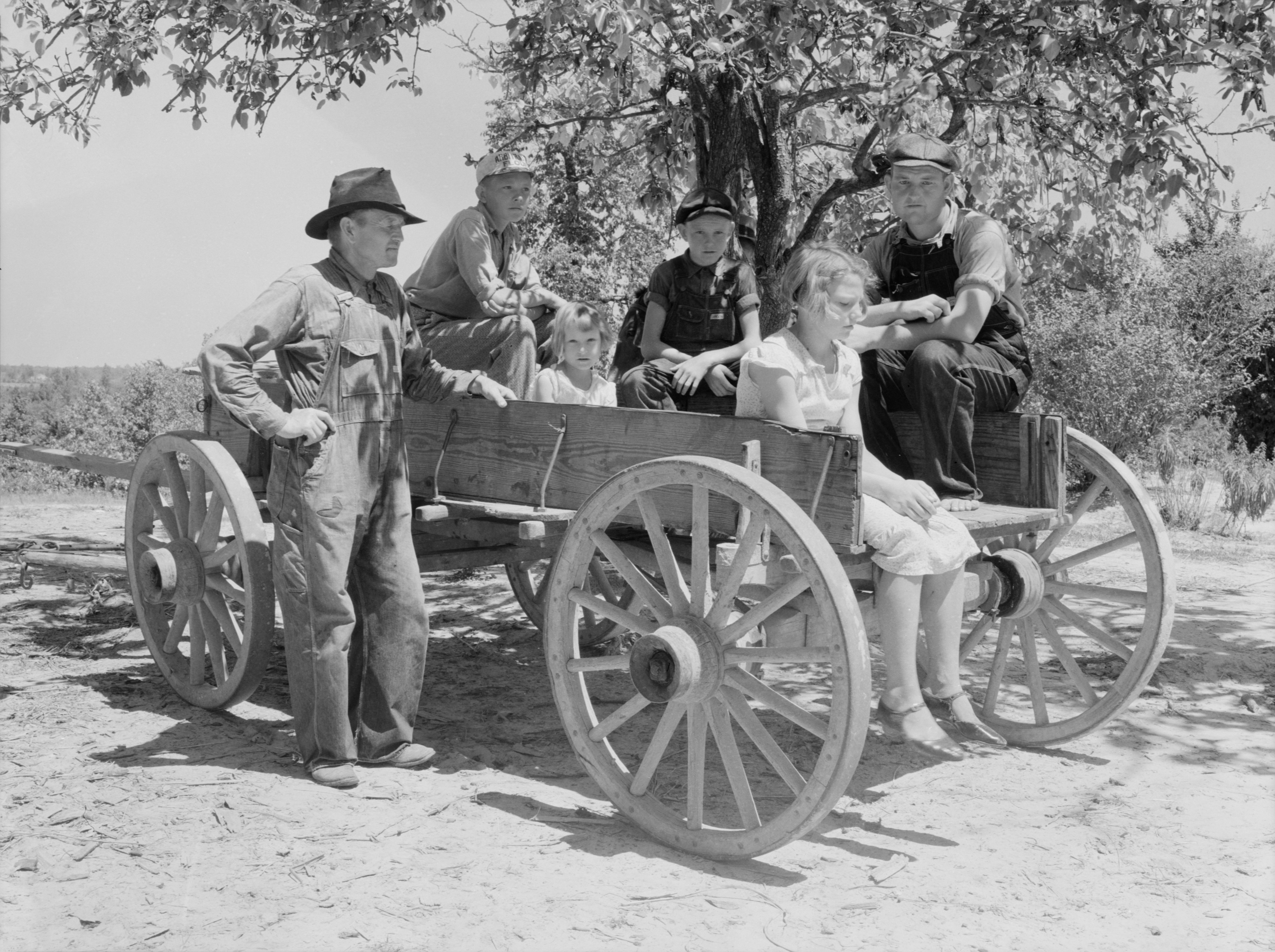
Family in a wagon, Lee County, Mississippi, United States, August 1935

A first-degree relative is one who shares 50% of your DNA through direct inheritance, such as a full sibling, parent or progeny.

There is another measure for the degree of relationship, which is determined by counting up generations to the first common ancestor and back down to the target individual, which is used for various genealogical and legal purposes.

Kinship	Degree of relationship by coefficient	Coefficient of relationship	Degree of relationship by counting generations to common ancestor
identical twins	0	100%	second-degree
sister / brother	first-degree	50% (2×2^{−2})	second-degree
mother / father / daughter / son	first-degree	50% (2^{−1})	first-degree
half-sister / half-brother	second-degree	25% (2^{−2})	second-degree
grandmother / grandfather / granddaughter / grandson	second-degree	25% (2^{−2})	second-degree
aunt / uncle / niece / nephew	second-degree	25% (2×2^{−3})	third-degree
half-aunt / half-uncle / half-niece / half-nephew	third-degree	12.5% (2^{−3})	third-degree
first-cousin	third-degree	12.5% (2×2^{−4})	fourth-degree
half-first-cousin	fourth-degree	6.25% (2^{−4})	fourth-degree
great-grandmother / great-grandfather / great-granddaughter / great-grandson	third-degree	12.5% (2^{−3})	third-degree
first-cousin-once-removed	fourth-degree	6.25% (2⋅2^{−5})	fifth-degree
second-cousin	fifth-degree	3.125% (2^{−6}+2^{−6})	sixth-degree

=== Terminologies ===
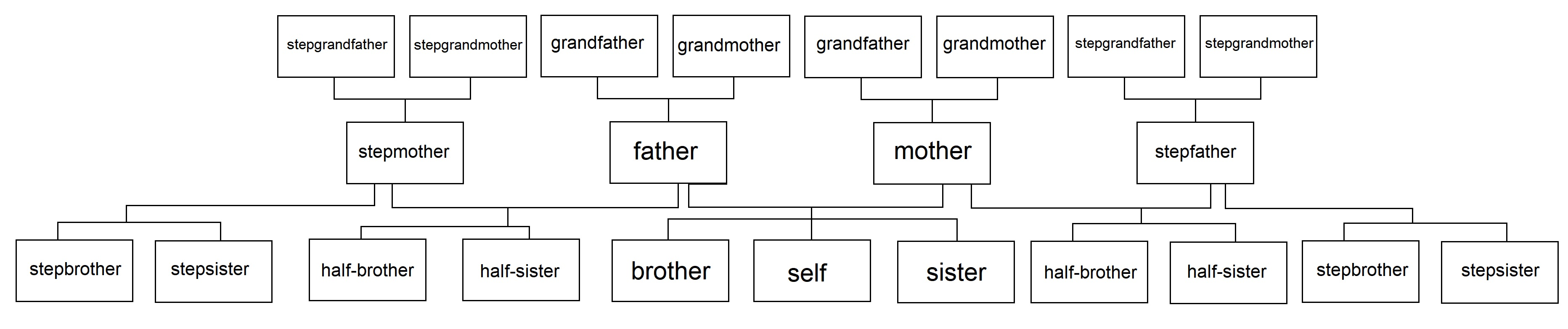
Family tree with some family members

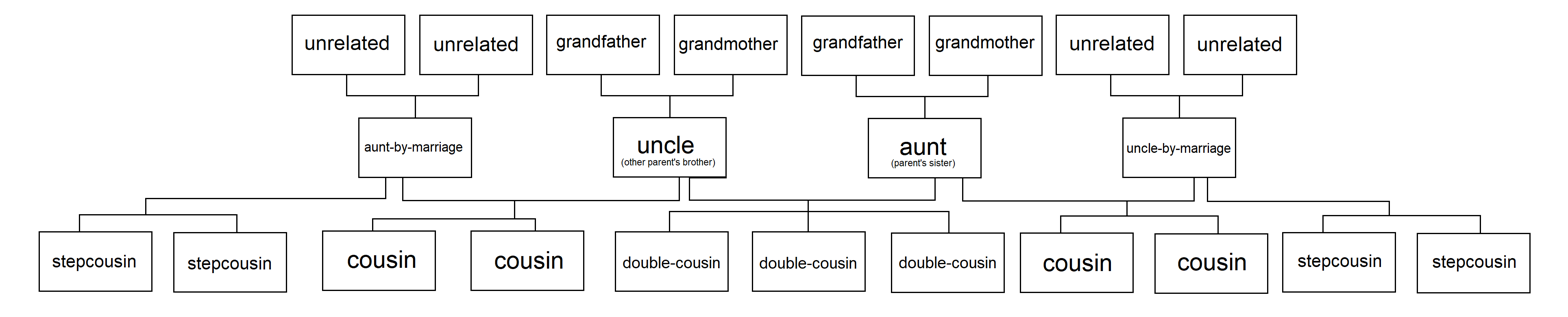
Family tree with other family members

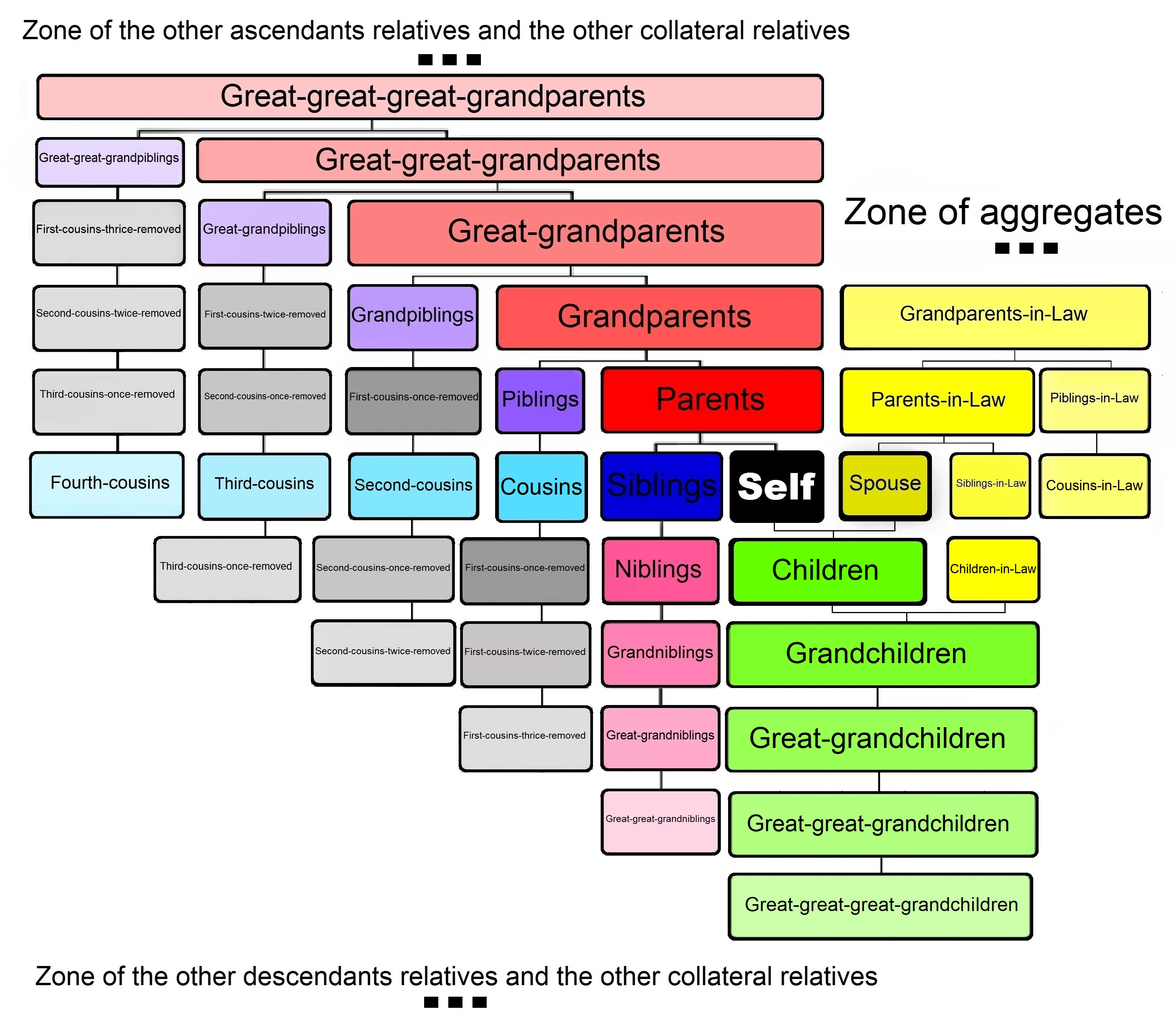
Table of degrees of kinship

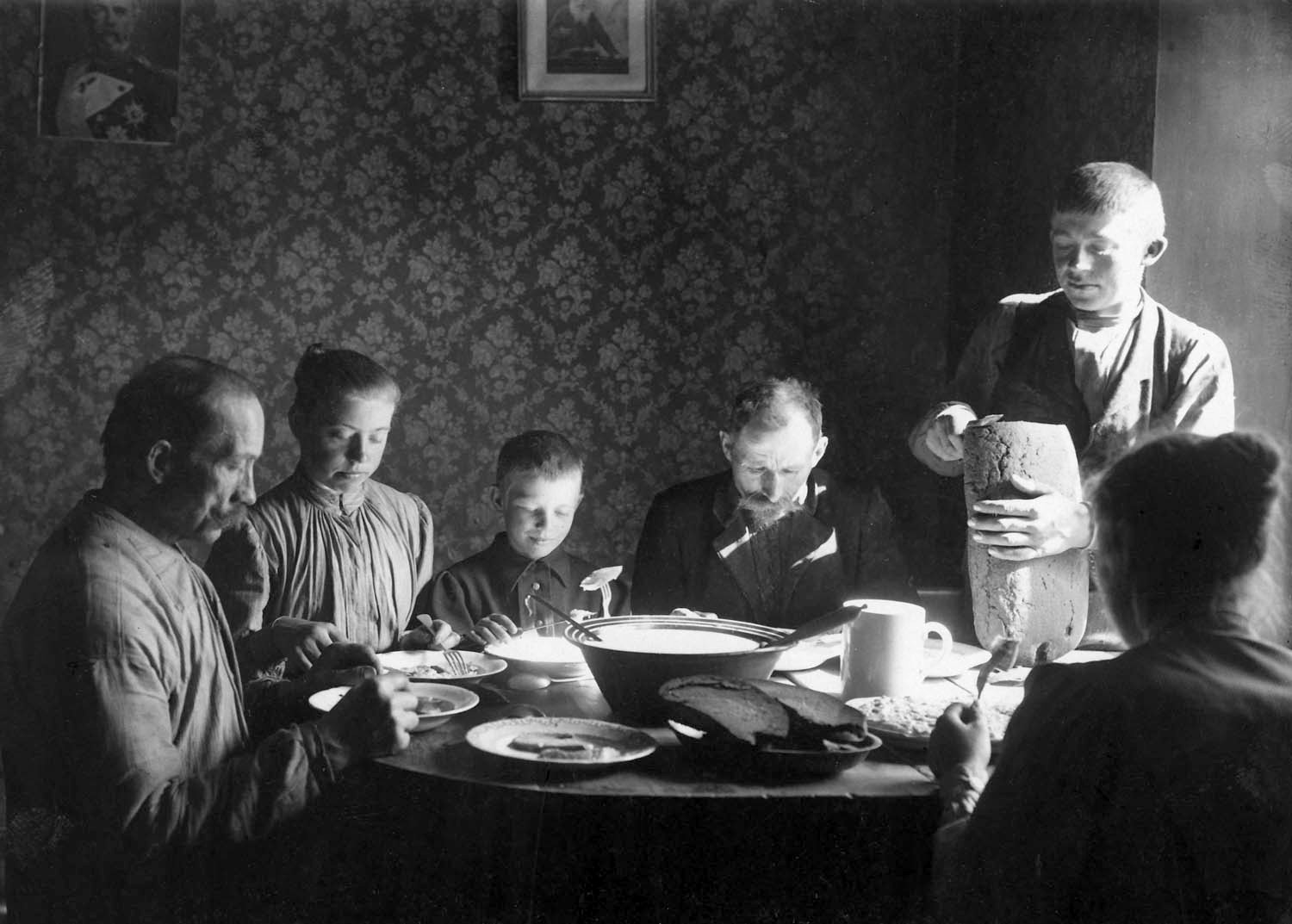
Swedish family eating, 1902

In his book Systems of Consanguinity and Affinity of the Human Family, anthropologist Lewis Henry Morgan (1818–1881) performed the first survey of kinship terminologies in use around the world. Although much of his work is now considered dated, he argued that kinship terminologies reflect different sets of distinctions. For example, most kinship terminologies distinguish between sexes (the difference between a brother and a sister) and between generations (the difference between a child and a parent). Moreover, he argued, kinship terminologies distinguish between relatives by blood and marriage (although recently some anthropologists have argued that many societies define kinship in terms other than "blood").

Morgan made a distinction between kinship systems that use classificatory terminology and those that use descriptive terminology. Classificatory systems are generally and erroneously understood to be those that "class together" with a single term relatives who actually do not have the same type of relationship to ego. (What defines "same type of relationship" under such definitions seems to be genealogical relationship. This is problematic given that any genealogical description, no matter how standardized, employs words originating in a folk understanding of kinship.) What Morgan's terminology actually differentiates are those (classificatory) kinship systems that do not distinguish lineal and collateral relationships and those (descriptive) kinship systems that do. Morgan, a lawyer, came to make this distinction in an effort to understand Seneca inheritance practices. A Seneca man's effects were inherited by his sisters' children rather than by his own children. Morgan identified six basic patterns of kinship terminologies:

- Hawaiian: only distinguishes relatives based upon sex and generation.
- Sudanese: no two relatives share the same term.
- Inuit: in addition to distinguishing relatives based upon sex and generation, also distinguishes between lineal relatives and collateral relatives.
- Iroquois: in addition to sex and generation, also distinguishes between siblings of opposite sexes in the parental generation.
- Crow: a matrilineal system with some features of an Iroquois system, but with a "skewing" feature in which generation is "frozen" for some relatives.
- Omaha: like a Crow system but patrilineal.

== Roles ==
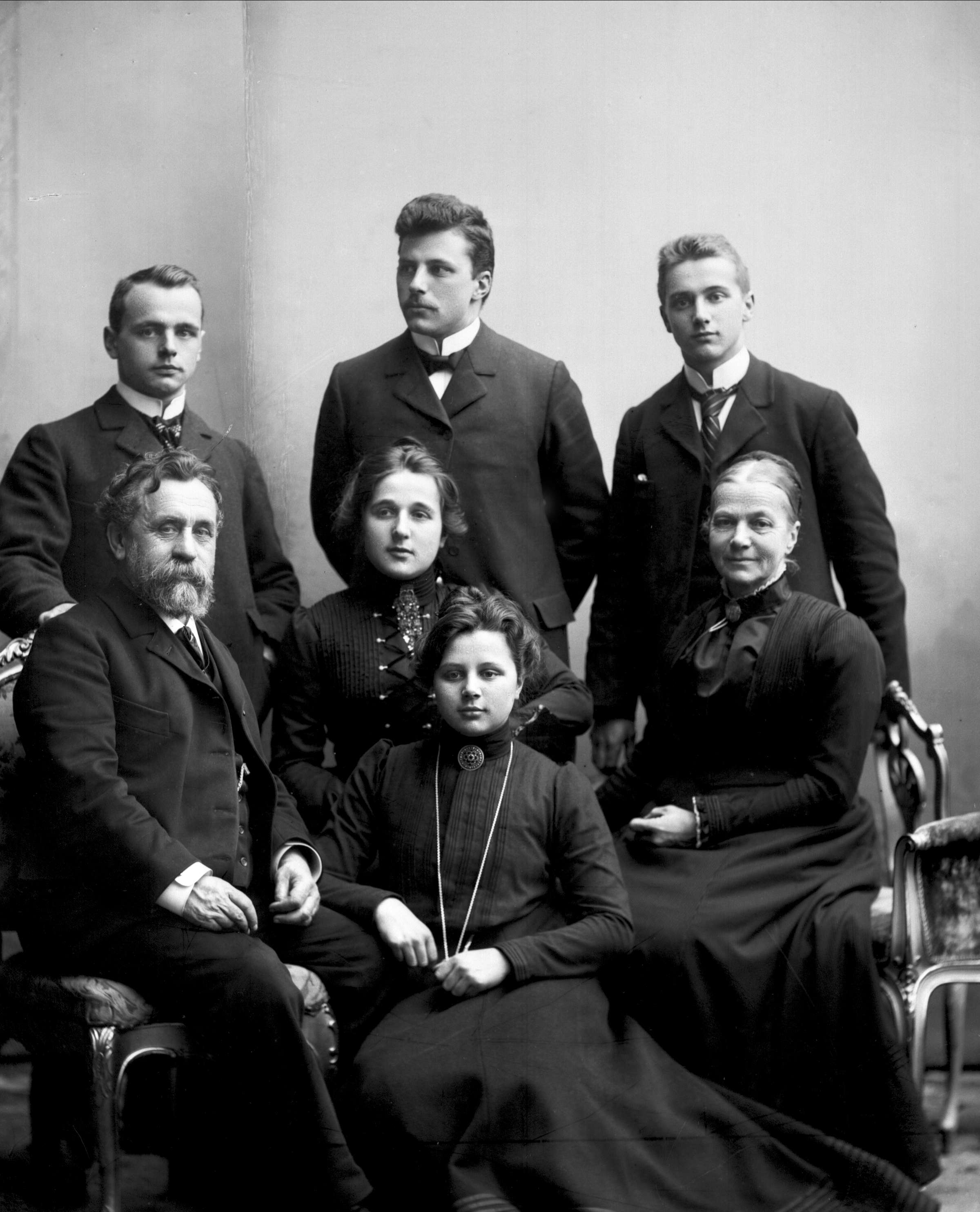
Group photograph of a Norwegian family by Gustav Borgen c. 1900: Father, mother, three sons and two daughters.

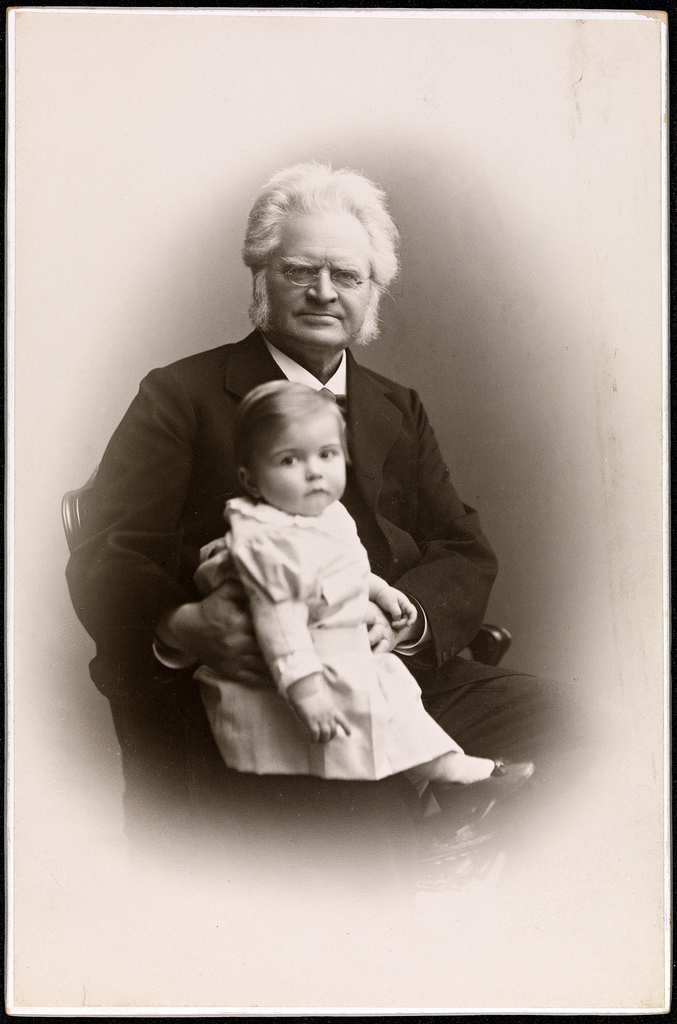
Bjørnstjerne Bjørnson with grandchild, 1900

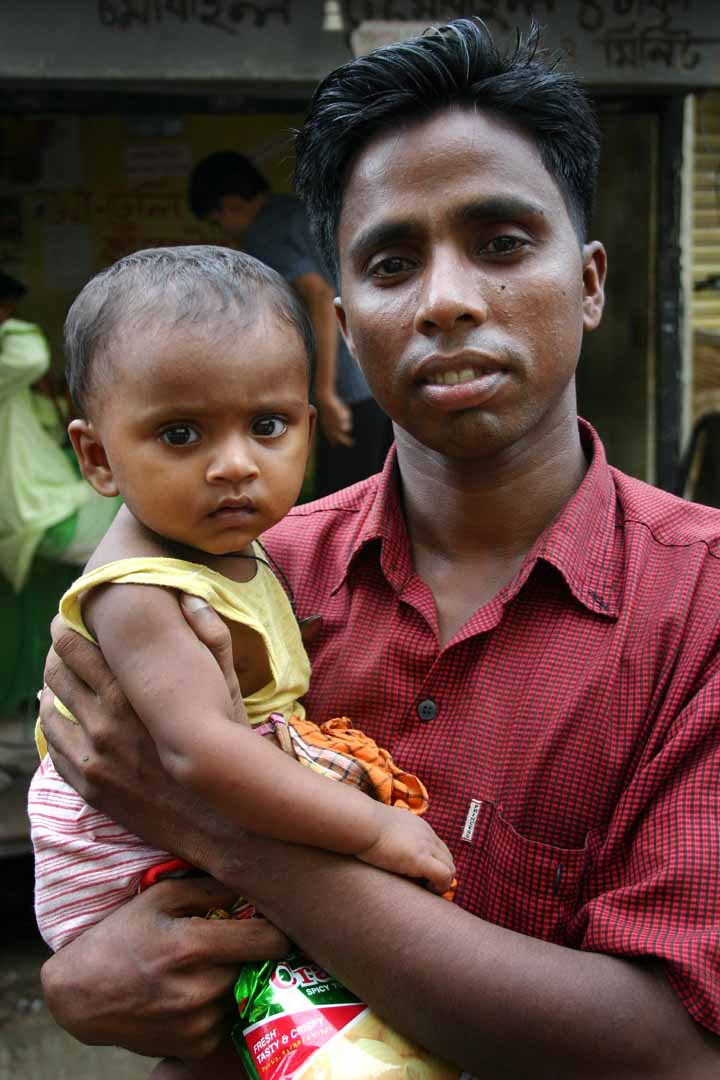
Father and child, Dhaka, Bangladesh

Most Western societies employ Eskimo kinship terminology. This kinship terminology commonly occurs in societies with strong conjugal, where families have a degree of relative mobility. Typically, societies with conjugal families also favor neolocal residence; thus upon marriage, a person separates from the nuclear family of their childhood (family of orientation) and forms a new nuclear family (family of procreation). Such systems generally assume that the mother's husband is also the biological father. The system uses highly descriptive terms for the nuclear family and progressively more classificatory as the relatives become more and more collateral.

=== Nuclear family ===
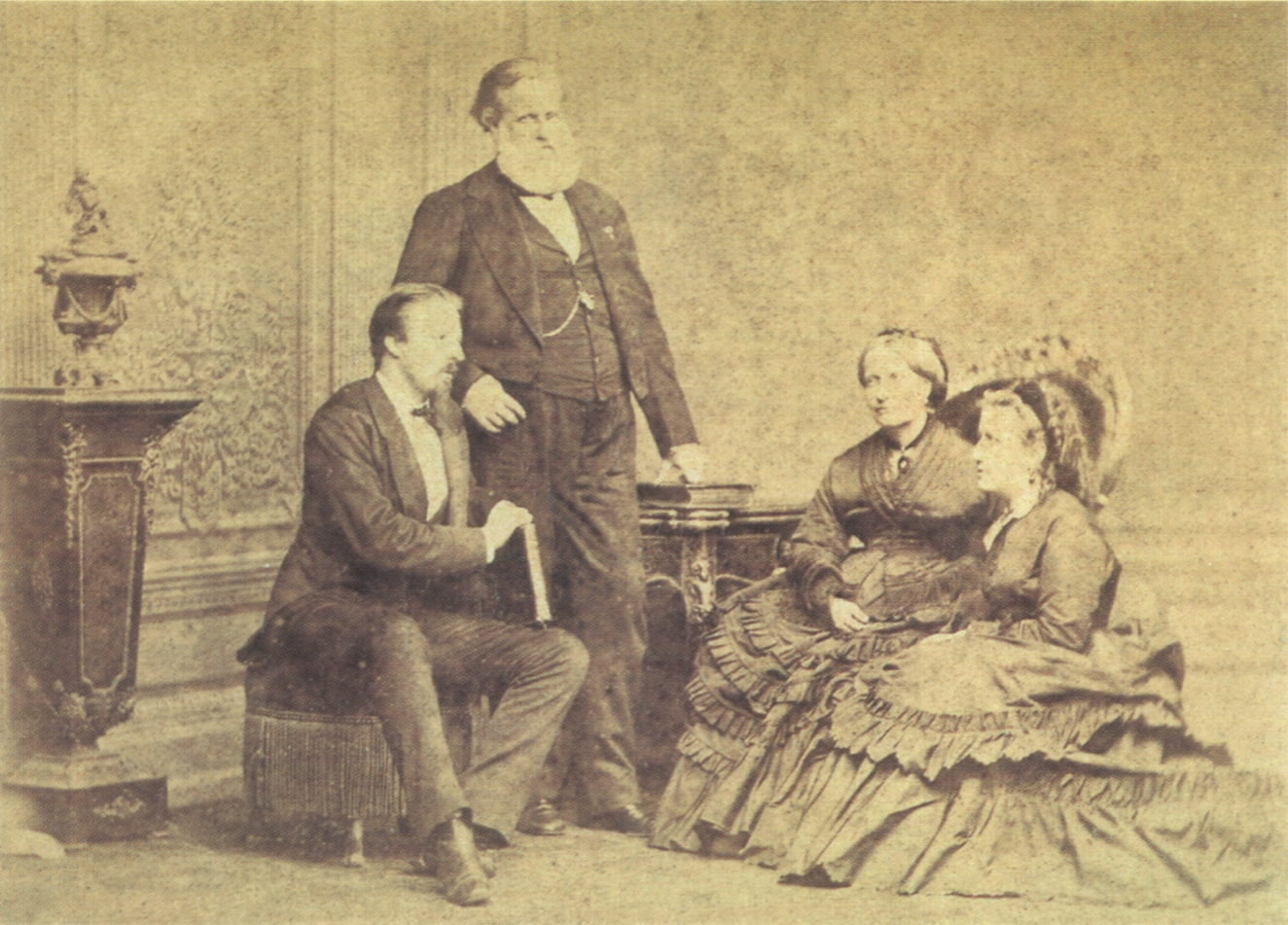
The main members of the Brazilian imperial family in 1875

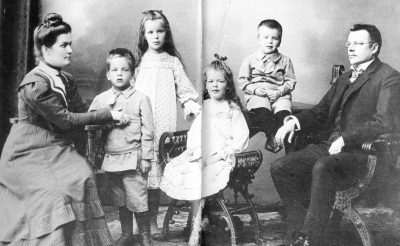
The family of Finnish statesman J. K. Paasikivi (right) in 1906

The system emphasizes the nuclear family. Members of the nuclear family use highly descriptive kinship terms, identifying directly only the husband, wife, mother, father, son, daughter, brother, and sister. All other relatives are grouped together into categories. Members of the nuclear family may be lineal or collateral. Kin, for whom these are family, refer to them in descriptive terms that build on the terms used within the nuclear family or use the nuclear family term directly.

Nuclear family of orientation

- Brother: the male child of a parent.
- Sister: the female child of a parent.
- Father: a male parent.
  - Grandfather: the father of a parent.
- Mother: a female parent.
  - Grandmother: the mother of a parent.

Nuclear conjugal family

- Husband: a male spouse.
- Wife: a female spouse.
- Son: a male child of the subject.
  - Grandson: a child's son.
- Daughter: a female child of the subject.
  - Granddaughter: a child's daughter.

Nuclear non-lineal family

- Spouse: husband or wife
  - Stepparent: a spouse of a parent that is not a biological parent
- Sibling: sister or brother
  - Half-sibling: a sibling with whom the subject shares only one biological parent
  - Step-sibling: a child of a parent that is not a biological parent

=== Collateral relatives ===
A sibling is a collateral relative with a minimal removal. For collateral relatives with one additional removal, one generation more distant from a common ancestor on one side, more classificatory terms come into play. These terms (Aunt, Uncle, Niece, and Nephew) do not build on the terms used within the nuclear family as most are not traditionally members of the household. These terms do not traditionally differentiate between a collateral relatives and a person married to a collateral relative (both collateral and aggregate). Collateral relatives with additional removals on each side are Cousins. This is the most classificatory term and can be distinguished by degrees of collaterality and by generation (removal).

When only the subject has the additional removal, the relative is the subject's parents' siblings, the terms Aunt and Uncle are used for female and male relatives respectively. When only the relative has the additional removal, the relative is the subjects siblings child, the terms Niece and Nephew are used for female and male relatives respectively. The spouse of a biological aunt or uncle is an aunt or uncle, and the nieces and nephews of a spouse are nieces and nephews. With further removal by the subject for aunts and uncles and by the relative for nieces and nephews the prefix "grand-" modifies these terms. With further removal the prefix becomes "great-grand-," adding another "great-" for each additional generation. For large numbers of generations a number can be substituted, for example, "fourth great-grandson", "four-greats grandson" or "four-times-great-grandson".

When the subject and the relative have an additional removal they are cousins. A cousin with minimal removal is a first cousin, i.e. the child of the subjects uncle or aunt. Degrees of collaterality and removals are used to more precisely describe the relationship between cousins. The degree is the number of generations subsequent to the common ancestor before a parent of one of the cousins is found, while the removal is the difference between the number of generations from each cousin to the common ancestor (the difference between the generations the cousins are from).

Cousins of an older generation (in other words, one's parents' first cousins), although technically first cousins once removed, are often classified with "aunts" and "uncles".

=== Aggregate relatives ===
English-speakers mark relationships by marriage (except for wife/husband) with the tag "-in-law". The mother and father of one's spouse become one's mother-in-law and father-in-law; the wife of one's son becomes one's daughter-in-law and the husband of one's daughter becomes one's son-in-law. The term "sister-in-law" refers to two essentially different relationships, either the wife of one's brother, or the sister of one's spouse. "Brother-in-law" is the husband of one's sister, or the brother of one's spouse. The terms "half-brother" and "half-sister" indicate siblings who share only one biological parent. The term "aunt-in-law" refers to the aunt of one's spouse. "Uncle-in-law" is the uncle of one's spouse. "Cousin-in-law" is the spouse of one's cousin, or the cousin of one's spouse. The term "niece-in-law" refers to the wife of one's nephew. "Nephew-in-law" is the husband of one's niece. The grandmother and grandfather of one's spouse become one's grandmother-in-law and grandfather-in-law; the wife of one's grandson becomes one's granddaughter-in-law and the husband of one's granddaughter becomes one's grandson-in-law.

In Indian English, a sibling in law who is the spouse of your sibling can be referred to as a co-sibling (specificity a co-sister or co-brother).

== Types of kinship ==
=== Patrilineal ===
Patrilineality, also known as the male line or agnatic kinship, is a form of kinship system in which an individual's family membership derives from and is traced through their father's lineage. It generally involves the inheritance of property, rights, names, or titles by persons related through male kin.

A patriline ("father line") is a person's father, and additional ancestors that are traced only through males. One's patriline is thus a record of descent from a man in which the individuals in all intervening generations are male. In cultural anthropology, a patrilineage is a consanguineal male and female kinship group, each of whose members is descended from the common ancestor through male forebears.

=== Matrilineal ===
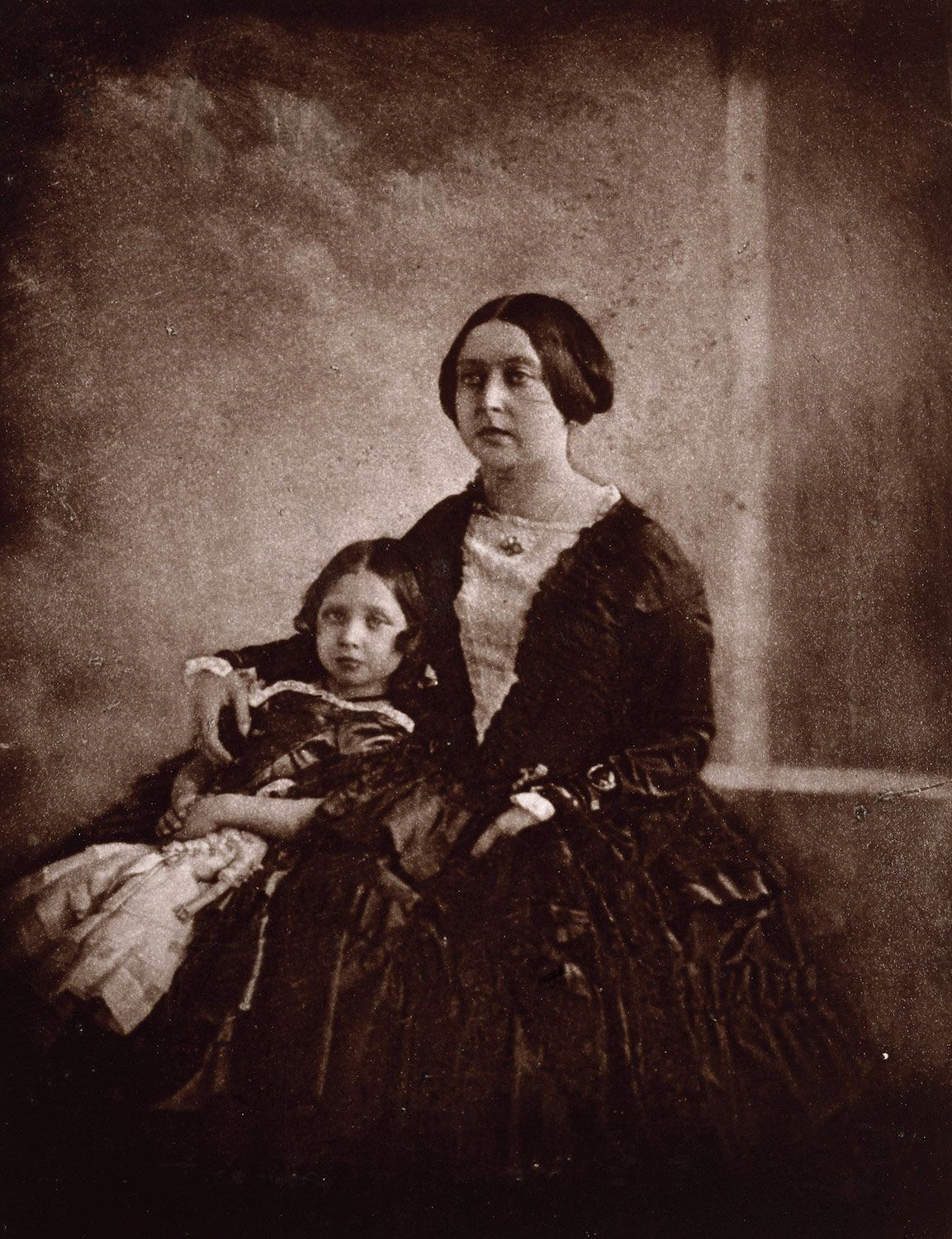
Queen Victoria, with her eldest daughter

Matrilineality is a form of kinship system in which an individual's family membership derives from and is traced through their mother's lineage.

It may also correlate with a societal system in which each person is identified with their matriline—their mother's lineage—and which can involve the inheritance of property and titles. A matriline is a line of descent from a female ancestor to a descendant in which the individuals in all intervening generations are mothers – in other words, a "mother line".

In a matrilineal descent system, an individual is considered to belong to the same descent group as her or his mother. This matrilineal descent pattern is in contrast to the more common patrilineal descent pattern.

=== Bilateral descent ===
Bilateral descent is a form of kinship system in which an individual's family membership derives from and is traced through both the paternal and maternal sides. The relatives on the mother's side and father's side are equally important for emotional ties or for transfer of property or wealth. It is a family arrangement where descent and inheritance are passed equally through both parents. Families who use this system trace descent through both parents simultaneously and recognize multiple ancestors, but unlike with cognatic descent it is not used to form descent groups.

Traditionally, this is found among some groups in West Africa, India, Australia, Indonesia, Melanesia, Malaysia and Polynesia. Anthropologists believe that a tribal structure based on bilateral descent helps members live in extreme environments because it allows individuals to rely on two sets of families dispersed over a wide area.

== History of theories ==
Early scholars of family history applied Darwin's biological theory of evolution in their theory of evolution of family systems. American anthropologist Lewis H. Morgan published Ancient Society in 1877 based on his theory of the three stages of human progress from Savagery through Barbarism to Civilization. Morgan's book was the "inspiration for Friedrich Engels' book" The Origin of the Family, Private Property and the State published in 1884.

Engels expanded Morgan's hypothesis that economical factors caused the transformation of primitive community into a class-divided society. Engels' theory of resource control, and later that of Karl Marx, was used to explain the cause and effect of change in family structure and function. The popularity of this theory was largely unmatched until the 1980s, when other sociological theories, most notably structural functionalism, gained acceptance.

=== The nuclear family in industrial society ===
Family arrangements in the United States have become more diverse with no particular household arrangement representing half of the United States population.

Contemporary society generally views the family as a haven from the world, supplying absolute fulfillment. Zinn and Eitzen discuss the image of the "family as haven ... a place of intimacy, love and trust where individuals may escape the competition of dehumanizing forces in modern society".

During industrialization, "[t]he family as a repository of warmth and tenderness (embodied by the mother) stands in opposition to the competitive and aggressive world of commerce (embodied by the father). The family's task was to protect against the outside world." However, Zinn and Eitzen note, "The protective image of the family has waned in recent years as the ideals of family fulfillment have taken shape. Today, the family is more compensatory than protective. It supplies what is vitally needed but missing in other social arrangements."

Unhappily married couples are at 3–25 times the risk of developing clinical depression.

"The popular wisdom", according to Zinn and Eitzen, sees the family structures of the past as superior to those today, and families as more stable and happier at a time when they did not have to contend with problems such as illegitimate children and divorce. They respond to this, saying, "there is no golden age of the family gleaming at us in the far back historical past." "Desertion by spouses, illegitimate children, and other conditions that are considered characteristics of modern times existed in the past as well."

=== The postmodern family ===
Percentage of births to unmarried women, selected countries, 1980 and 2007

Others argue that whether or not one views the family as "declining" depends on one's definition of "family". "Married couples have dropped below half of all American households. This drop is shocking from traditional forms of the family system. Only a fifth of households were following traditional ways of having married couples raising a family together." In the Western World, marriages are no longer arranged for economic, social or political gain, and children are no longer expected to contribute to family income. Instead, people choose mates based on love. This increased role of love indicates a societal shift toward favoring emotional fulfilment and relationships within a family, and this shift necessarily weakens the institution of the family.

Margaret Mead considers the family as a main safeguard to continuing human progress. Observing, "Human beings have learned, laboriously, to be human", she adds: "we hold our present form of humanity on trust, [and] it is possible to lose it" ... "It is not without significance that the most successful large-scale abrogations of the family have occurred not among simple savages, living close to the subsistence edge, but among great nations and strong empires, the resources of which were ample, the populations huge, and the power almost unlimited"

Many countries (particularly Western) have, in recent years, changed their family laws in order to accommodate diverse family models. For instance, in the United Kingdom, in Scotland, the Family Law (Scotland) Act 2006 provides cohabitants with some limited rights. In 2010, Ireland enacted the Civil Partnership and Certain Rights and Obligations of Cohabitants Act 2010. There have also been moves at an international level, most notably, the Council of Europe European Convention on the Legal Status of Children Born out of Wedlock which came into force in 1978. Countries which ratify it must ensure that children born outside marriage are provided with legal rights as stipulated in the text of this convention. The convention was ratified by the UK in 1981 and by Ireland in 1988.

In the United States, one in five mothers has children by different fathers; among mothers with two or more children the figure is higher, with 28% having children with at least two different men. Such families are more common among Blacks and Hispanics and among the lower socioeconomic class.

However, in western society, the single parent family has been growing more accepted and has begun to make an impact on culture. Single parent families are more commonly single mother families than single father. These families sometimes face difficult issues besides the fact that they have to rear their children on their own, for example, low income making it difficult to pay for rent, child care, and other necessities for a healthy and safe home.

Furthermore, there are families that consist of two mothers, two fathers, non-binary, trans, and queer folks raising children. This is made possible due to surrogacy, IVF, IUI, adoption, and other processes.

== Domestic violence ==
Domestic violence (DV) is violence that happens within the family. The legal and social understanding of the concept of DV differs by culture. The definition of the term "domestic violence" varies, depending on the context in which it is used. It may be defined differently in medical, legal, political or social contexts. The definitions have varied over time, and vary in different parts of the world.

The Convention on preventing and combating violence against women and domestic violence states that:

"domestic violence" shall mean all acts of physical, sexual, psychological or economic violence that occur within the family or domestic unit or between former or current spouses or partners, whether or not the perpetrator shares or has shared the same residence with the victim.

In 1993, the United Nations Declaration on the Elimination of Violence against Women identified domestic violence as one of three contexts in which violence against women occurs, describing it as:

Physical, sexual and psychological violence occurring in the family, including battering, sexual abuse of female children in the household, dowry-related violence, marital rape, female genital mutilation and other traditional practices harmful to women, non-spousal violence and violence related to exploitation.

=== Family violence ===
Family violence is a broader definition, often used to include child abuse, elder abuse, and other violent acts between family members.

Child abuse is defined by the WHO as:

Child maltreatment, sometimes referred to as child abuse and neglect, includes all forms of physical and emotional ill-treatment, sexual abuse, neglect, and exploitation that results in actual or potential harm to the child's health, development or dignity. Within this broad definition, five subtypes can be distinguished – physical abuse; sexual abuse; neglect and negligent treatment; emotional abuse; and exploitation.

There exists legislation to prevent and punish the occurrence of these offences. There are laws regarding familial sexual activity, which states that it is a criminal offence to have any kind of sexual relationship between one's grandparent, parent, sibling, aunt or uncle.

Elder abuse is, according to the WHO: "a single, or repeated act, or lack of appropriate action, occurring within any relationship where there is an expectation of trust which causes harm or distress to an older person".

==== Parental abuse of children (child abuse) ====
Child abuse is the physical, sexual or emotional maltreatment or neglect of a child or children. In the United States, the Centers for Disease Control and Prevention (CDC) and the Department for Children and Families (DCF) define child maltreatment as any act or series of acts of commission or omission by a parent or other caregiver that results in harm, potential for harm, or threat of harm to a child. Child abuse can occur in a child's home, or in the organizations, schools or communities the child interacts with. There are four major categories of child abuse: neglect, physical abuse, psychological or emotional abuse, and sexual abuse.

==== Parental abuse by children ====
Abuse of parents by their children is a common but under reported and under-researched subject. A factor why this subject is under-researched is because of the overshadowing effect caused by parents abusing their children instead. Parents are quite often subject to levels of childhood aggression in excess of normal childhood aggressive outbursts, typically in the form of verbal or physical abuse. Parents feel a sense of shame and humiliation to have that problem, so they rarely seek help and it is usually little or no help available anyway.

==== Elder abuse ====
Elder abuse is "a single, or repeated act, or lack of appropriate action, occurring within any relationship where there is an expectation of trust, which causes harm or distress to an older person". This definition has been adopted by the World Health Organization from a definition put forward by Action on Elder Abuse in the UK. Laws protecting the elderly from abuse are similar to, and related to, laws protecting dependent adults from abuse.

The core element to the harm of elder abuse is the "expectation of trust" of the older person toward their abuser. Thus, it includes harms by people the older person knows or with whom they have a relationship, such as a spouse, partner or family member, a friend or neighbor, or people that the older person relies on for services. Many forms of elder abuse are recognized as types of domestic violence or family violence.

=== Forced and child marriage ===
Forced and child marriages are practiced in certain regions of the world, particularly in Asia and Africa, and these types of marriages are associated with a high rate of domestic violence.

A forced marriage is a marriage where one or both participants are married without their freely given consent. The line between forced marriage and consensual marriage may become blurred, because the social norms of many cultures dictate that one should never oppose the desire of one's parents/relatives in regard to the choice of a spouse; in such cultures it is not necessary for violence, threats, intimidation etc. to occur, the person simply "consents" to the marriage even if they do not want it, out of the implied social pressure and duty. The customs of bride price and dowry, that exist in parts of the world, can lead to buying and selling people into marriage.

A child marriage is a marriage where one or both spouses are under 18. Child marriage was common throughout history but is today condemned by international human rights organizations. Child marriages are often arranged between the families of the future bride and groom, sometimes as soon as the girl is born. Child marriages can also occur in the context of marriage by abduction.

== The concept of family honour ==
Family honor is an abstract concept involving the perceived quality of worthiness and respectability that affects the social standing and the self-evaluation of a group of related people, both corporately and individually. The family is viewed as the main source of honor and the community highly values the relationship between honor and the family. The conduct of family members reflects upon family honor and the way the family perceives itself, and is perceived by others. In cultures of honor maintaining the family honor is often perceived as more important than either individual freedom, or individual achievement. In extreme cases, engaging in acts that are deemed to tarnish the honor of the family results in honor killings. An honor killing is the homicide of a member of a family or social group by other members, due to the perpetrators' belief that the victim has brought shame or dishonor upon the family or community, usually for reasons such as refusing to enter an arranged marriage, being in a relationship that is disapproved by their relatives, having sex outside marriage, becoming the victim of rape, dressing in ways which are deemed inappropriate, or engaging in homosexual relations.

== Economic issues ==
A family is often part of a sharing economy with common ownership.

=== Dowry, bride price and dower ===
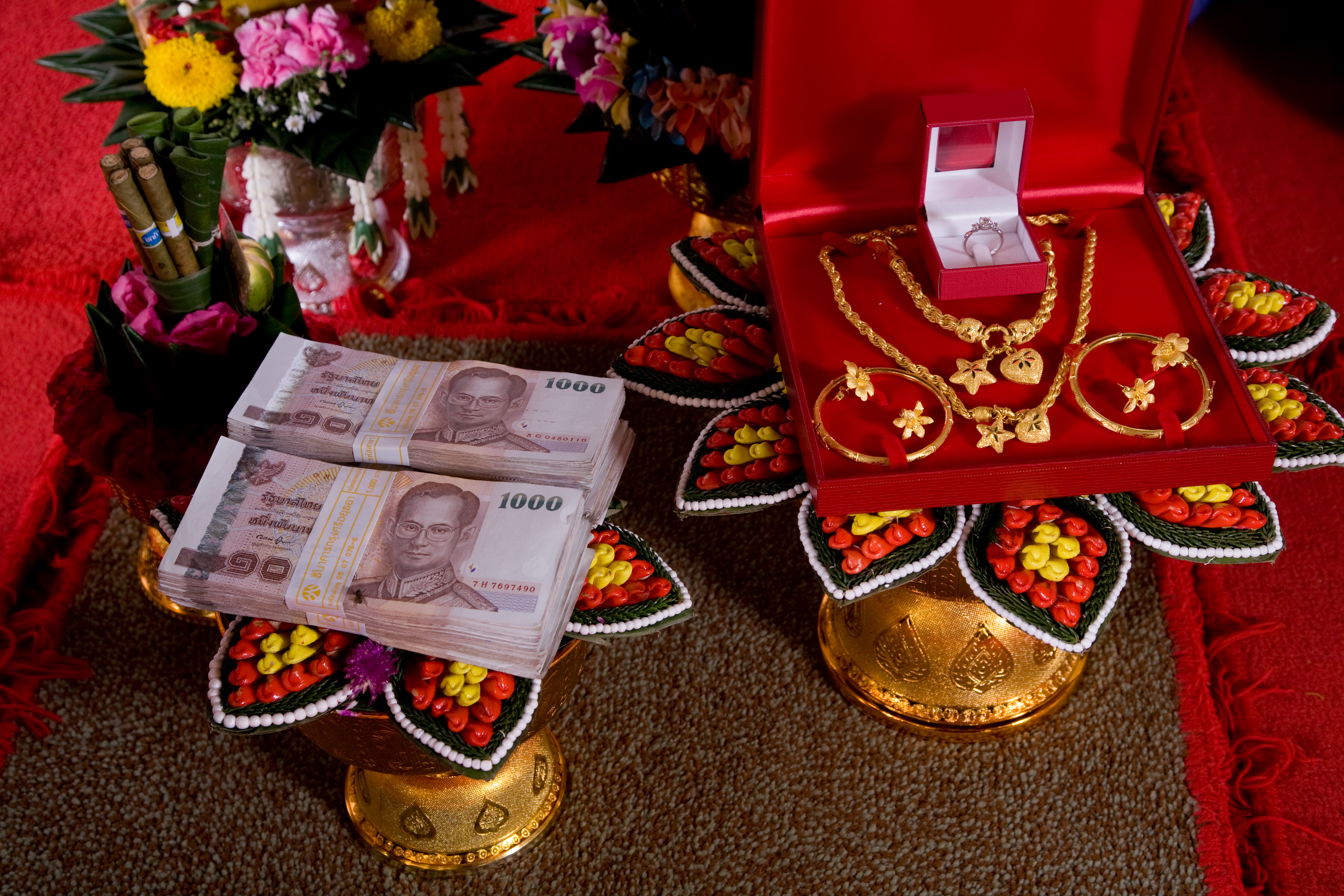
A traditional, formal presentation of the bride price at a Thai engagement ceremony

Dowry is property (money, goods, or estate) that a wife or wife's family gives to her husband when the wife and husband marry. Offering dowry was common in many cultures historically (including in Europe and North America), but this practice today is mostly restricted to some areas primarily in the Indian subcontinent.

Bride price, (also bride wealth or bride token), is property paid by the groom or his family to the parents of a woman upon the marriage of their daughter to the groom. It is practiced mostly in Sub-Saharan Africa, parts of South-East Asia (Thailand, Cambodia), and parts of Central Asia.

Dower is property given to the bride herself by the groom at the time of marriage, and which remains under her ownership and control.

=== Property regimes and taxation ===
In some countries married couples benefit from various taxation advantages not available to a single person or to unmarried couples. For example, spouses may be allowed to average their combined incomes. Some jurisdictions recognize common law marriage or de facto relations for this purposes. In some jurisdictions there is also an option of civil partnership or domestic partnership.

Different property regimes exist for spouses. In many countries, each marriage partner has the choice of keeping their property separate or combining properties. In the latter case, called community property, when the marriage ends by divorce each owns half. In lieu of a will or trust, property owned by the deceased generally is inherited by the surviving spouse.

== Rights and laws ==
=== Family rights ===
The right to family is enshrined in the Universal Declaration of Human Rights of 1948 by the United Nations:

The family is the natural and fundamental group unit of society and is entitled to protection by society and the State.

— Universal Declaration of Human Rights, Article 16.3

Georg Hegel's view of families as legal persons is reflected in the legal system of some countries.

=== Reproductive rights ===
Map of countries by fertility rate (2020), according to the Population Reference Bureau

Reproductive rights are legal rights and freedoms relating to reproduction and reproductive health. These include the right to decide on issues regarding the number of children born, family planning, contraception, and private life, free from coercion and discrimination; as well as the right to access health services and adequate information. According to UNFPA, reproductive rights "include the right to decide the number, timing and spacing of children, the right to voluntarily marry and establish a family, and the right to the highest attainable standard of health, among others". Family planning refers to the factors that may be considered by individuals and couples in order for them to control their fertility, anticipate and attain the desired number of children and the spacing and timing of their births.

The state and church have been, and still are in some countries, involved in controlling the size of families, often using coercive methods, such as bans on contraception or abortion (where the policy is a natalist one—for example through tax on childlessness) or conversely, discriminatory policies against large families (e.g., China's one-child policy in place from 1978 to 2015) or even forced abortions. Forced sterilization has often targeted ethnic minority groups, such as Roma women in Eastern Europe, or indigenous women in Peru (during the 1990s).

=== Parents' rights ===
The parents' rights movement is a movement whose members are primarily interested in issues affecting parents and children related to family law, specifically parental rights and obligations. Mothers' rights movements focus on maternal health, workplace issues such as labor rights, breastfeeding, and rights in family law. The fathers' rights movement is a movement whose members are primarily interested in issues related to family law, including child custody and child support, that affect fathers and their children.

=== Children's rights ===
Children's rights are the human rights of children, with particular attention to the rights of special protection and care afforded to minors, including their right to association with both parents, their right to human identity, their right to be provided in regard to their other basic needs, and their right to be free from violence and abuse.

=== Marriage rights ===
Each jurisdiction has its own marriage laws. These laws differ significantly from country to country; and these laws are often controversial. Areas of controversy include women's rights as well as same-sex marriage.

=== Legal reforms ===
==== Gender equality ====
Legal reforms to family laws have taken place in many countries during the past few decades. These dealt primarily with gender equality within marriage and with divorce laws. Women have been given equal rights in marriage in many countries, reversing older family laws based on the dominant legal role of the husband. Coverture, which was enshrined in the common law of England and the US for several centuries and throughout most of the 19th century, was abolished. In some European countries the changes that lead to gender equality were slower. The period of 1975–1979 saw a major overhaul of family laws in countries such as Italy, Spain, Austria, West Germany, and Portugal. In 1978, the Council of Europe passed the Resolution (78) 37 on equality of spouses in civil law. Among the last European countries to establish full gender equality in marriage were Switzerland. In 1985, a referendum guaranteed women legal equality with men within marriage. The new reforms came into force in January 1988. In Greece, in 1983, legislation was passed guaranteeing equality between spouses, abolishing dowry, and ending legal discrimination against illegitimate children. In 1981, Spain abolished the requirement that married women must have their husbands' permission to initiate judicial proceedings the Netherlands, and France (Note: Although married women in France obtained the right to work without their husbands' permission in 1965, and the paternal authority of a man over his family was ended in 1970 (before that parental responsibilities belonged solely to the father who made all legal decisions concerning the children), it was only in 1985 that a legal reform abolished the stipulation that the husband had the sole power to administer the children's property.) in the 1980s. In recent decades, the marital power has also been abolished in African countries that had this doctrine, but many African countries that were former French colonies still have discriminatory laws in their marriages regulations, such regulations originating in the Napoleonic Code that has inspired these laws.

==== Divorce ====
In some countries (predominantly Roman Catholic) divorce was legalized only recently (e.g. Italy (1970), Portugal (1975), Brazil (1977), Spain (1981), Argentina (1987), Ireland (1996), Chile (2004) and Malta (2011)) although annulment and legal separation were options. The Philippines still does not allow divorce. (see Divorce law by country). The laws pertaining to the situation of children born outside marriage have also been revised in many countries (see Legitimacy (family law)).

== Health ==
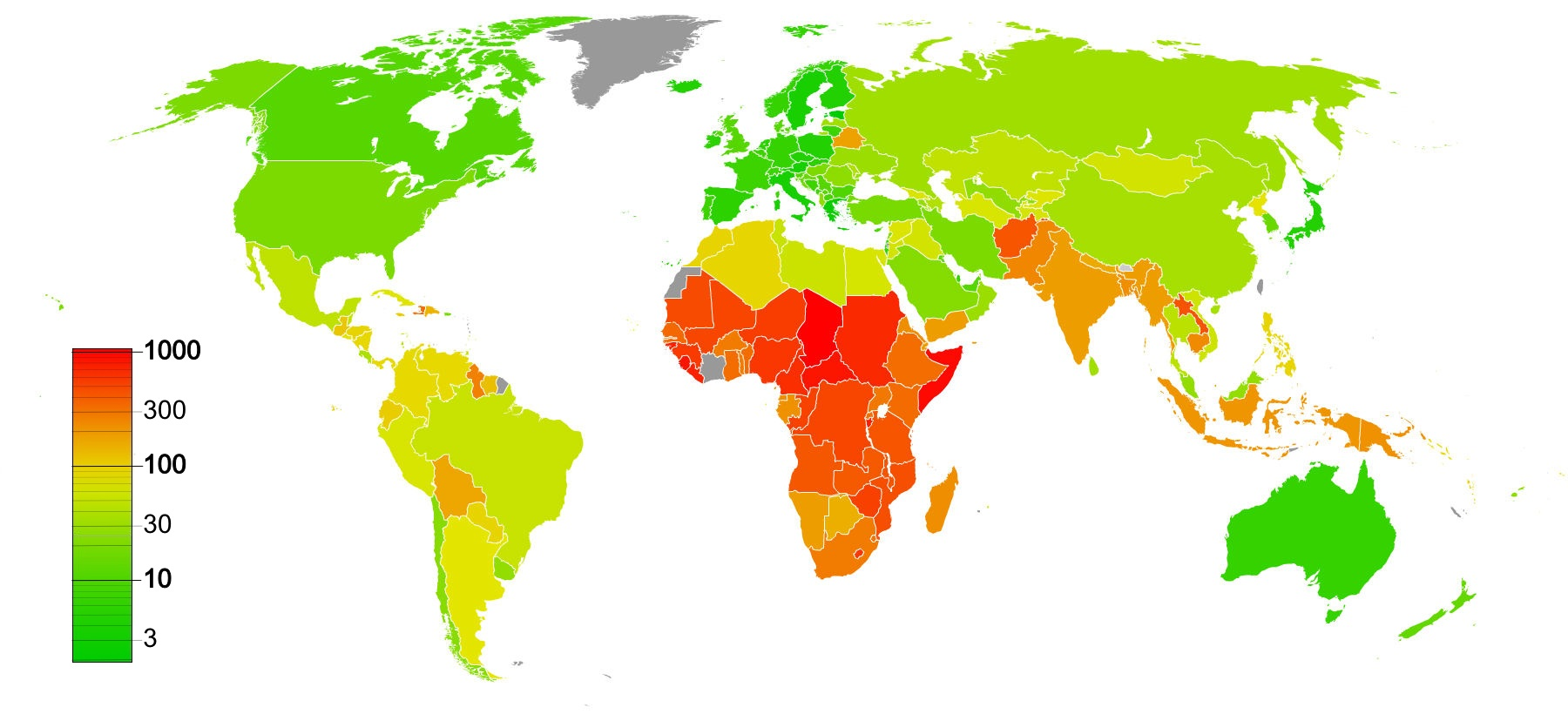
Global maternal mortality rate per 100 000 live births, (2010)

=== Family medicine ===
Family medicine is a medical specialty devoted to comprehensive health care for people of all ages; it is based on knowledge of the patient in the context of the family and the community, emphasizing disease prevention and health promotion. The importance of family medicine is being increasingly recognized.

World infant mortality rates in 2012

=== Maternal mortality ===
Maternal mortality or maternal death is defined by WHO as "the death of a woman while pregnant or within 42 days of termination of pregnancy, irrespective of the duration and site of the pregnancy, from any cause related to or aggravated by the pregnancy or its management but not from accidental or incidental causes." Historically, maternal mortality was a major cause of women's death. In recent decades, advances in healthcare have resulted in rates of maternal mortality having dropped dramatically, especially in Western countries. Maternal mortality, however, remains a serious problem in many African and Asian countries.

=== Infant and child mortality ===
Infant mortality is the death of a child less than one year of age. Child mortality is the death of a child before the child's fifth birthday. Like maternal mortality, infant and child mortality were common throughout history, but have decreased significantly in modern times.

== Politics ==
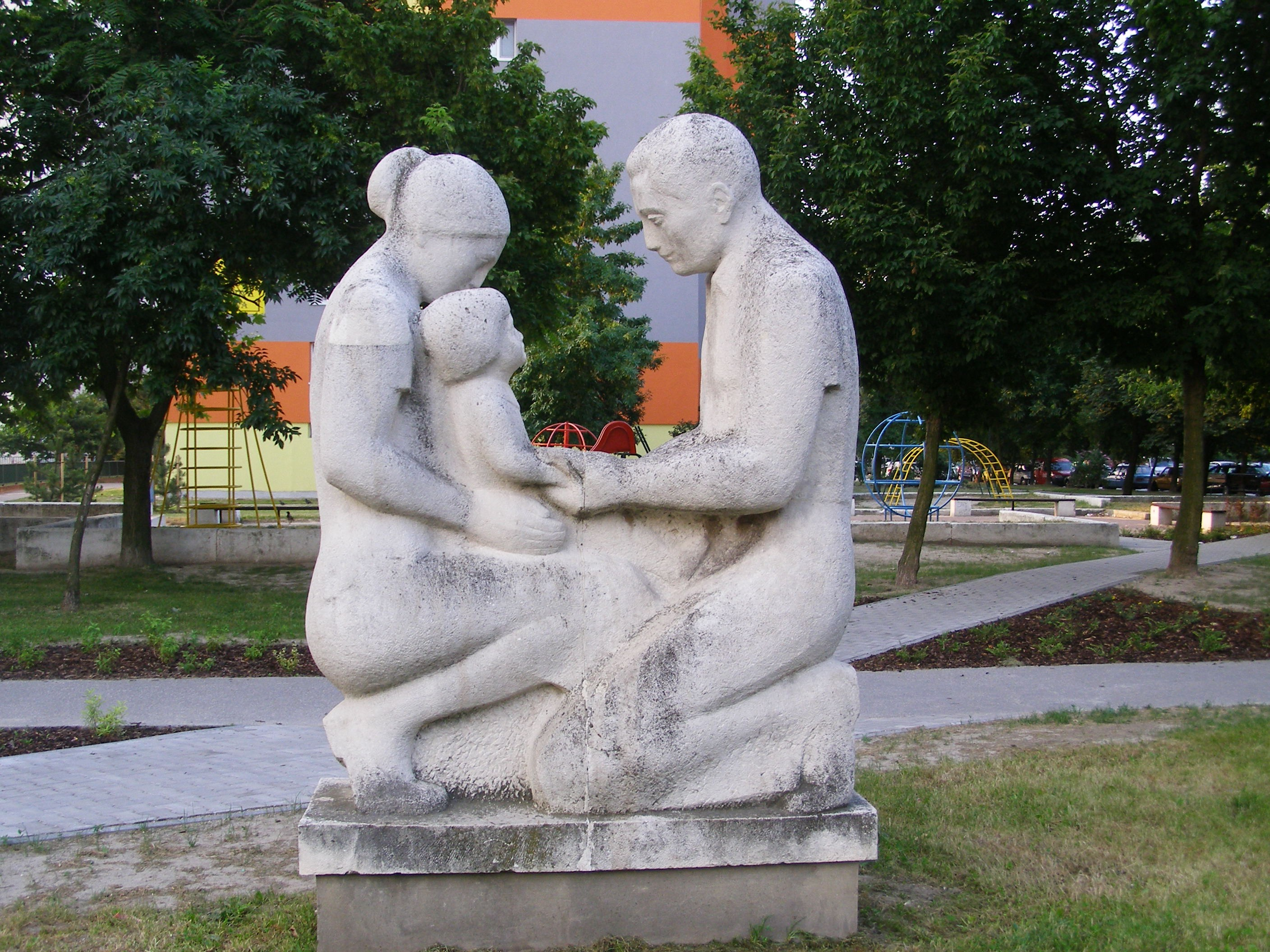
Parents with child statue, Hrobákova street, Petržalka, Bratislava

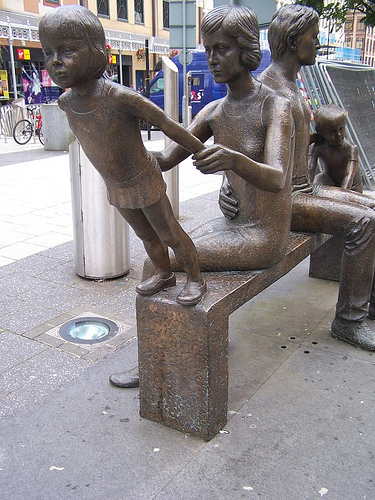
The Family, a sculpture by Robert Thomas, in Cardiff, Wales

While in many parts of the world family policies seek to promote a gender-equal organization of the family life, in others the male-dominated family continues to be the official policy of the authorities, which is also supported by law. For instance, the Civil Code of Iran states at Article 1105: "In relations between husband and wife; the position of the head of the family is the exclusive right of the husband".

In some parts of the world, some governments promote a specific form of family, such as that based on traditional family values. The term "family values" is often used in political discourse in some countries, its general meaning being that of traditional or cultural values that pertain to the family's structure, function, roles, beliefs, attitudes, and ideals, usually involving the "traditional family"—a middle-class family with a breadwinner father and a homemaker mother, raising their biological children. Any deviation from this family model is considered a "nontraditional family". These family ideals are often advanced through policies such as marriage promotion. Some jurisdictions outlaw practices which they deem as socially or religiously unacceptable, such as fornication, cohabitation or adultery.

== Work–family balance ==
Work–family balance is a concept involving proper prioritizing between work/career and family life. It includes issues relating to the way how work and families intersect and influence each other. At a political level, it is reflected through policies such maternity leave and paternity leave. Since the 1950s, social scientists as well as feminists have increasingly criticized gendered arrangements of work and care, and the male breadwinner role, and policies are increasingly targeting men as fathers, as a tool of changing gender relations.

=== Protection of private and family life ===
Article 8 of the European Convention on Human Rights provides a right to respect for one's "private and family life, his home and his correspondence", subject to certain restrictions that are "in accordance with law" and "necessary in a democratic society".

Article 8 – Right to respect for private and family life

1. Everyone has the right to respect for his private and family life, his home and his correspondence.

2. There shall be no interference by a public authority with the exercise of this right except such as is in accordance with the law and is necessary in a democratic society in the interests of national security, public safety or the economic well-being of the country, for the prevention of disorder or crime, for the protection of health or morals, or for the protection of the rights and freedom of others.

== Criticism ==
The Russian-American rationalist and individualist philosopher, novelist and playwright Ayn Rand compared partiality towards consanguinity with racism, as a small-scale manifestation of the latter. "The worship of the family is merely racism, like a crudely primitive first installment on the worship of the tribe. It places the accident of birth above a man's values and duty to the tribe above a man's right to his own life." Additionally, she spoke in favor of childfree lifestyle, while following it herself.

== The family and social justice ==
One of the controversies regarding the family is the application of the concept of social justice to the private sphere of family relations, in particular with regard to the rights of women and children. Throughout much of the history, most philosophers who advocated for social justice focused on the public political arena, not on the family structures; with the family often being seen as a separate entity which needed to be protected from outside state intrusion. One notable exception was John Stuart Mill, who, in his work The Subjection of Women, advocated for greater rights for women within marriage and family. Second wave feminists argued that the personal is political, stating that there are strong connections between personal experiences and the larger social and political structures. In the context of the feminist movement of the 1960s and 1970s, this was a challenge to the nuclear family and family values, as they were understood then. Feminists focused on domestic violence, arguing that the reluctance—in law or in practice—of the state to intervene and offer protection to women who have been abused within the family, is in violation of women's human rights, and is the result of an ideology which places family relations outside the conceptual framework of human rights.

== Global trends in family composition ==
Statistics from an infographic by Olivier Ballou showed that,

In 2013, just over 40% of US babies were born outside marriage. The Census bureau estimated that 27% of all children lived in a fatherless home. Europe has seen a surge in child-free adults. One in five 40-something women are childless in Sweden and in Switzerland, in Italy one in four, in Berlin one in three. So-called traditional societies are seeing the same trend. About one-sixth of Japanese women in their forties have never married and about 30% of all women that age are childless.

— Infographic Olivier Ballou (AEI)

However, Swedish statisticians reported in 2013 that, in contrast to many countries, since the 2000s, fewer children have experienced their parents' separation, childlessness had decreased in Sweden and marriages had increased. It had also become more common for couples to have a third child suggesting that the nuclear family was no longer in decline in Sweden.

== See also ==
- Ageing Without Children – UK charity founded in 2021
- Childlessness – State of not having children
- Familialism – Philosophy that prioritizes the family
- Family economics – Application of economic concepts to the study of the family
- Household – Group sharing accommodation and meals
- Nepotism – Favoritism granted to relatives
- Parent – Caregiver of offspring in their own species
- Stepfamily – Family where one parent has children that are not genetically related to the other parent
- Voluntary childlessness – Lifestyle choice

== Bibliography ==
- Collier, Richard; Sheldon, Sally, eds. (2006). Fathers' Rights Activism and Law Reform in Comparative Perspective. Hart Publishing. ISBN 978-1-84113-629-5.
- Monica McGoldrick; Nydia A. Garcia Preto; Betty A. Carter (2015). The Expanding Family Life Cycle: Individual, Family, and Social Perspectives. Pearson Education. ISBN 978-0-205-96806-0. Archived from the original on 17 February 2017.
- Daly, Mary (2011). "What adult worker model? A critical look at recent social policy reform in Europe from a gender and family perspective". Social Politics. 18 (1): 1–23. doi:10.1093/sp/jxr002. PMID 21692242. S2CID 21306624.
- Daly, Mary; Lewis, Jane (2000). "The concept of social care and the analysis of contemporary welfare states". British Journal of Sociology. 51 (2): 281–98. doi:10.1111/j.1468-4446.2000.00281.x. PMID 10905001. Archived from the original on 2019-06-29.
- Esping-Andersen, Gøsta (2009). The incomplete revolution: Adapting welfare states to women's new roles. Cambridge: Polity Press.
- Ferragina, Emanuele; Seeleib-Kaiser, Martin (2015). "Determinants of a Silent (R)evolution:Understanding the Expansion of Family Policy in Rich OECD Countries". Social Politics. 22 (1): 1–37. doi:10.1093/sp/jxu027.
- Forbes, Scott, A Natural History of Families, (Princeton, NJ: Princeton University Press, 2005), ISBN 0-691-09482-9
- Foucault, Michel (1978). The History of Sexuality: Volume I: An Introduction. (New York: Vintage Books). ISBN 978-0-679-72469-8
- Gilroy, Paul "Identity Belonging and the Critique of Pure Sameness" in Gilroy, Paul (2000) Against Race: Imagining Political Culture Beyond the Color Line, (Cambridge, Mass.: Belknap Press of Harvard University Press), Ch. I.3, pp. 97–133
- Goody, Jack The Development of the Family and Marriage in Europe Archived 2016-05-19 at the Wayback Machine (Cambridge University Press, 1980); translated into Spanish, French, Italian, Portuguese.
- Mock, Douglas W., More Than Kin and Less Than Kind, (Belknap Press, 2004), ISBN 0-674-01285-2
- Schneider, David M., American Kinship: a cultural approach (Chicago: University of Chicago Press, 1980).
- Tabak, I.; Mazur, J.; Granado, M.C.; Örkenyi, Á.; Zaborskis, A.; Aasvee, K.; Moreno, C. (2012). "Examining trends in parent-child communication in Europe over 12 years". The Journal of Early Adolescence. 32 (1): 26–54. doi:10.1177/0272431611419509. S2CID 206496782.
- Chevallier, Denis (1985). "Famille et parenté: une bibliographie". Terrain (in French). 4 (4): 77–82. doi:10.4000/terrain.2874. Archived from the original on July 24, 2008.
- Zeitzen, Miriam Koktvedgaard (2008). Polygamy: a cross-cultural analysis. Berg. ISBN 978-1-84520-220-0.
- Zinn, Maxine Baca; Eitzen, D. Stanley (1987). Diversity in American families. p. 3 p. 8
