= Jural rights =

Jural rights is a doctrine of Kentucky law that prevents the legislature (and presumably the judiciary as well) from eliminating common law causes of action that existed at the time the current Kentucky Constitution was instituted.

== Constitutional basis of the doctrine ==
The doctrine of jural rights is based on a concerted reading of the following sections of the Kentucky Constitution:

- 14: All courts shall be open, and every person for an injury done him in his lands, goods, person or reputation, shall have remedy by due course of law, and right and justice administered without sale, denial or delay.
- 54: The General Assembly shall have no power to limit the amount to be recovered for injuries resulting in death, or for injuries to person or property.
- 241: Whenever the death of a person shall result from an injury inflicted by negligence or wrongful act, then, in every such case, damages may be recovered for such death.

== Application of the doctrine ==
The doctrine was announced in Ludwig v. Johnson, 243 Ky. 533, 49 S.W.2d 347 (1932). In Ludwig, a statute prohibiting a non-paying passenger from suing the operator for negligence was found unconstitutional. The doctrine has been upheld several times since then, but remains the subject of criticism that it is a judicial fiction.

The doctrine was reaffirmed in Williams v. Wilson, 972 S.W.2d 260 (Ky. 1998), where the court invalidated a statute requiring a finding of intent for punitive damages to be available. The court reasoned that punitive damages were available for gross negligence in 1891 (when the Constitution took effect), and that the malice requirement of the statute in question effectively banned a cause of action based on negligence.
