= Olivia Harris =

British social anthropologist

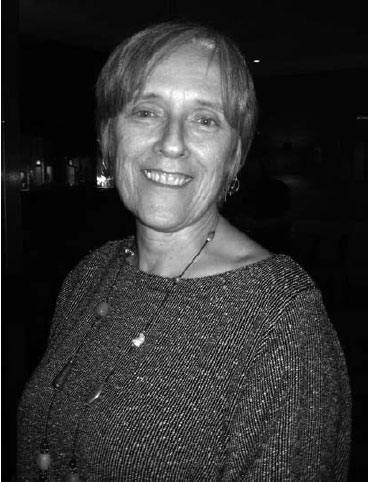
- Born: August 26, 1948
- Died: April 9, 2009 (aged 60)
- Education: University of Oxford; London School of Economics
- Known for: Ethnography of the Aymara, Andean gender constructs, anthropology of work and time
- Scientific career
- Fields: Social anthropology
- Workplaces: Goldsmiths, University of London; London School of Economics; University of Chicago; University of Oslo

Olivia Jane Harris (26 August 1948 – 9 April 2009) was a British social anthropologist whose work focused on the study of the Bolivian highlands. Her writing includes analyses of fertility, gender, money, conceptions of work and of time, the relation between law and custom, as well as the Inca and Spanish colonisation of current-day Bolivia.

== Early life and education ==
Olivia Jane Harris was born on 26 August 1948 and read classics at St Anne's College, Oxford. She moved on to become a post-graduate student at the London School of Economics (LSE) anthropology department. As part of her studies, she conducted ethnographic fieldwork from 1972 to 1974 among Aymara speaking communities in Potosí, Bolivia.

== Professional career ==
Harris worked for most of her career at Goldsmiths' College, University of London, where she co-founded the Goldsmiths' anthropology department in 1986. She held visiting positions at the University of Chicago and the University of Oslo, before joining the LSE's department of anthropology. Harris became chair of the LSE department of anthropology in 2005. She also served as vice-president of the Royal Anthropological Society and on the 2008 Research Assessment Exercise.

== Work and thought ==
=== Gender ===
Based on her study of Laymi speaking rural cultivators in the Bolivian Andes, Harris questioned not only the associative pairs of female and nature as opposed to male and culture but also the dichotomy of domestic and female on the one hand vs. public and male on the other. According to her work, the Laymi saw both male and female as symbolically represented in domesticated and wild spaces.

=== Work ===
In describing Andean conceptions of work, Harris foregrounded the positive value that the Laymi ascribed to it, the importance of working in groups and the wider relevance that work has beyond material or economic goals. She thereby argues that the question of what makes people work is central to understanding human existence, and that it cannot be understood with neoclassical concepts of economic analysis.

== Personal life ==
Harris was born as the fourth child of Julia Harris and Sir Ronald Harris, then a senior civil servant in the Cabinet Office. She spent her childhood in Stoke d'Abernon after losing her mother to cancer at the age of seven. Her father later remarried.
