= Audie Award for Business and Personal Development =

Award from the Audio Publishers Association

The Audie Award for Business and Personal Development is one of the Audie Awards presented annually by the Audio Publishers Association (APA). It awards excellence in narration, production, and content for a business, educational, self-help, or motivational audiobook released in a given year.

Before 2016, this was given as two distinct awards: One was given from 2008 to 2015 as the Audie Award for Personal Development, from 2002 to 2007 as the Audie Award for Personal Development or Motivational Title, and from 1997 to 2001 as the Audie Award for Personal Development or Self-Help.

The other was given from 2008 to 2015 as the Audie Award for Business or Educational Title, and from 2002 to 2007 as the Audie Award for Business Information or Educational Title. Before 2002 this award itself was given as two distinct awards: One was given from 1999 to 2001 as the Audie Ward for Business Information, and from 1997 to 1998 as the Audie Award for Business.

The other was given from 2000 to 2001 as the Audie Award for Educational and Training Title, in 1999 as the Audie Award for Educational Title, and from 1996 to 1998 as the Audie Award for Educational, How-To, or Instructional Title.

== Winners and finalists ==
=== 2010s ===
Year	Title	Author(s)	Narrator(s)	Publisher	Result	Ref.
2016 21st	Wake Up Happy: The Dream Big, Win Big Guide to Transforming Your Life (2015)	Michael Strahan and Veronica Chambers	Michael Strahan	Simon & Schuster Audio	Winner	
2016 21st	Act Like a Lady, Think Like a Man (2009)	Steve Harvey	Mike Hodge	HarperAudio	Finalist	
2016 21st	A Curious Mind (2015)	Brian Grazer and Charles Fishman	Norbert Leo Butz	Simon & Schuster Audio	Finalist	
2016 21st	Get Big Things Done: The Power of Connectional Intelligence (2015)	Erica Dhawan and Saj-nicole Joni	Christina Moore	Recorded Books	Finalist	
2016 21st	Talking to Crazy	Mark Goulston	L. J. Ganser	Audible	Finalist	
2017 22nd	Humans Need Not Apply (2015)	Jerry Kaplan	John Pruden	Tantor Audio	Winner	
2017 22nd	Capital Offenses: Business Crime and Punishment in America's Corporate Age (2016)	Samuel W. Buell	L. J. Ganser	Audible	Finalist	
2017 22nd	Shrill: Notes from a Loud Woman (2016)	Lindy West	Lindy West	Hachette Audio	Finalist	
2017 22nd	The Storyteller's Secret (2016)	Carmine Gallo	Carmine Gallo	Macmillan Audio	Finalist	
2017 22nd	Trekonomics: The Economics of Star Trek (2016)	Manu Saadia	Oliver Wyman	Audible	Finalist	
2018 23rd	Peak Performance (2017)	Brad Stulberg and Steve Magness	Christopher Lane	Brilliance Audio	Winner	
2018 23rd	Do More Great Work (2010)	Michael Bungay Stanier	Daniel Maté	Post Hypnotic Press	Finalist	
2018 23rd	Getting There: A Book of Mentors (2015)	Gillian Zoe Segal	Jorjeana Marie, René Ruiz, and Alex Hyde-White	Novel Audio	Finalist	
2018 23rd	How to Work for an Idiot (Revised and Expanded with More Idiots, More Insanity, and More Incompetency): Survive and Thrive Without Killing Your Boss (2003)	John Hoover	Brian Sutherland	Audible	Finalist	
2018 23rd	Unfuck Yourself (2017)	Gary John Bishop	Gary John Bishop	HarperAudio	Finalist	
2019 24th	How to Be Heard (2017)	Julian Treasure	Julian Treasure	Blackstone Audio	Winner	
2019 24th	Courage to Be Disliked (2013)	Ichiro Kishimi and Fumitake Koga	Noah Galvin, Graeme Malcolm, and January LaVoy	Simon & Schuster Audio	Finalist	
2019 24th	The Dichotomy of Leadership (2018)	Jocko Willink and Leif Babin	Jocko Willink and Leif Babin	Macmillan Audio	Finalist	
2019 24th	Doughnut Economics: Seven Ways to Think Like a 21st-Century Economist (2017)	Kate Raworth	Kate Raworth	Chelsea Green Publishing	Finalist	
2019 24th	The Gentle Art of Swedish Death Cleaning (2017)	Margareta Magnusson	Juliet Stevenson	Simon & Schuster Audio	Finalist	
2019 24th	The Opposite of Hate (2018)	Sally Kohn	Sally Kohn	HighBridge Audio	Finalist	

=== 2020s ===
Year	Title	Author(s)	Narrator(s)	Publisher	Result	Ref.
2020 25th	So You Want to Start a Podcast? (2019)	Kristen Meinzer	Kristen Meinzer	HarperAudio	Winner	
2020 25th	The Barefoot Spirit (2013)	Michael Houlihan, Bonnie Harvey, and Rick Kushman	Alamada Karatihy, Ed Asner, and full cast	Footnotes Press	Finalist	
2020 25th	Calm the Fuck Down (2016)	Sarah Knight	Sarah Knight	HarperAudio	Finalist	
2020 25th	Nine Lies About Work: A Freethinking Leader's Guide to the Real World (2018)	Marcus Buckingham and Ashley Goodall	Marcus Buckingham and Ashley Goodall	Gildan Media	Finalist	
2020 25th	Wolfpack: How to Come Together, Unleash Our Power and Change the Game (2019)	Abby Wambach	Abby Wambach	Macmillan Audio	Finalist	
2021 26th	The Gift: 12 Lessons to Save Your Life (2020)	Edith Eva Eger	Tovah Feldshuh	Simon & Schuster Audio	Winner	
2021 26th	How I Built This: The Unexpected Paths to Success from the World's Most Inspiring Entrepreneurs (2020)	Guy Raz	Guy Raz	Audible	Finalist	
2021 26th	Hustle Harder, Hustle Smarter (2021)	Curtis Jackson (50 Cent)	Curtis Jackson (50 Cent)	HarperAudio	Finalist	
2021 26th	Improvise!: Use the Secrets of Improv to Achieve Extraordinary Results at Work (2020)	Max Dickins	Steve West	Brilliance Audio	Finalist	
2021 26th	Tools of Titans: The Tactics, Routines, and Habits of Billionaires, Icons, and World-Class Performers (2016)	Tim Ferris	Tim Ferris, Ryan Holiday, Kevin Rose, Jocko Willink, Tim Kreider, Ralph Potts, Mike Delaponte, Kaleo Griffith, Ray Porter, and Thérèse Plummer	Audible	Finalist	
2022 27th	Machiavelli for Women	Stacey Vanek Smith	Stacey Vanek Smith	Simon & Schuster Audio	Winner	
2022 27th	Badass Habits	Jen Sincero	Jen Sincero	Penguin Random House Audio	Finalist	
2022 27th	Carry On	John Lewis with Kabir Sehgal, foreword by Andrew Young	Don Cheadle	Hachette Audio	Finalist	
2022 27th	Uncomfortable Conversations with a Black Man	Emmanuel Acho	Emmanuel Acho	Macmillan Audio	Finalist	
2022 27th	What Happened to You?	Oprah Winfrey and Bruce D. Perry	Oprah Winfrey and Bruce D. Perry	Macmillan Audio	Finalist	
2023 28th	Tough	Terry Crews	Terry Crews	Penguin Random House Audio	Winner	
2023 28th	Building a Second Brain	Tiago Forte	André Santana	Simon & Schuster Audio	Finalist	
2023 28th	Prep, Push, Pivot	Octavia Goredema	Patrick Harris II	Heinemann	Finalist	
2023 28th	Sustain Your Game	Alan Stein and Jon Sternfeld, foreword by Rece Davis	Zoleka Vundla	Ascent Audio	Finalist	
2023 28th	The First Five: A Love Letter to Teachers	Patrick Harris II	Alan Stein and Rece Davis	Hachette Audio	Finalist	
2024 29th	The Light We Carry	Michelle Obama	Michelle Obama	Penguin Random House Audio	Winner	
2024 29th	Diva 2.0: 12 Life Lessons from Me for You	Sheryl Lee Ralph	Sheryl Lee Ralph	Recorded Books	Finalist	
2024 29th	Win Every Argument: The Art of Debating, Persuading, and Public Speaking	Mehdi Hasan	Mehdi Hasan	Macmillan Audio	Finalist	
2024 29th	Please Unsubscribe, Thanks!	Julio Vincent Gambuto	Julio Vincent Gambuto	Simon & Schuster Audio	Finalist	
2024 29th	The Wisdom of Morrie	Morrie Schwartz, edited by Rob Schwartz	Rob Schwartz and Steven Weber	Blackstone Publishing	Finalist	
2025 30th	Come Together	Emily Nagoski	Emily Nagoski	Penguin Random House Audio	Winner	
2025 30th	And Then We Rise	Common	Common	HarperAudio	Finalist	
2025 30th	Fluke: Chance, Chaos, and Why Everything We Do Matters	Brian Klaas	Brian Klaas	Simon & Schuster Audio	Finalist	
2025 30th	Humans Who Teach: A Guide for Centering Love, Justice, and Liberation in Schools	Shamari Reid	Shamari Reid	Heinemann	Finalist	
2025 30th	Women Money Power: The Rise and Fall of Economic Equality	Josie Cox	Josie Cox	Recorded Books, Inc.	Finalist	
2026 31st	The Next Conversation	Jefferson Fisher	Jefferson Fisher	Penguin Random House Audio	Winner	
2026 31st	Breaking Trauma Bonds with Narcissists and Psychopaths	Shahida Arabi	Rachel Perry	Tantor Audio	Finalist	
2026 31st	The Let Them Theory	Mel Robbins	Mel Robbins	Audible Studios	Finalist	
2026 31st	Perseverance > Endurance	Blayne Smith and Brandon Young	Joe Knezevich	Brilliance Publishing	Finalist	
2026 31st	Strong Ground	Brené Brown	Brené Brown	Penguin Random House Audio	Finalist	

== Business winners and finalists 1996–2015 ==
=== 1990s ===
Business winners and finalists 1996-1999
Year	Title	Author(s)	Narrator(s)	Publisher	Result	Ref.
1997 2nd	The Art of War (5th century B.C.)	Sun Tzu	Ron Silver and B. D. Wong	Dove Audio	Winner	
1997 2nd	Marshall Loeb's Lifetime Financial Strategies (1996)	Marshall Loeb	Marshall Loeb	Time Warner AudioBooks	Finalist	
1997 2nd	The Perfect Business (1996)	Michael LeBoeuf	Michael LeBoeuf	Simon & Schuster Audio	Finalist	
1998 3rd	Pour Your Heart Into It: How Starbucks Built a Company One Cup at a Time (1997)	Howard Schultz	Eric Conger	HighBridge Audio	Winner	
1998 3rd	Ben & Jerry's Double-dip Capitalism (1997)	Ben Cohen and Jerry Greenfield	Ben Cohen and Jerry Greenfield	Simon & Schuster Audio	Finalist	
1998 3rd	Forbes Great Minds of Business (1997)	Andrew Grove, Fred Smith, Peter Lynch, Pleasant Rowland, and Paul Volcker	Andrew Grove, Fred Smith, Peter Lynch, Pleasant Rowland, and Paul Volcker	Simon & Schuster Audio	Finalist	
1999 4th	Entrepreneur November 1998 (1998)	Rieva Lesonsky, Elaine Fioreillo, Brian Ruberry, Cassandra Cavanah, Danielle Kennedy, Jay Conrad Levinson, Mark Henricks, and Jacquelynn Lynn	Petrea Burchard, Milton Lawrence, John Matthew, Jim Rondeau, and Allison Strong	DriveTimes	Winner	
1999 4th	Entrepreneur December 1998 (1998)		Petrea Burchard et al.	DriveTimes	Finalist	
1999 4th	SPIN Selling (1988)	Neil Rackham	Neil Rackham	HighBridge Audio	Finalist	

=== 2000s ===
Business winners and finalists 2000-2009
Year	Title	Author(s)	Narrator(s)	Publisher	Result	Ref.
2000 5th	Beer Blast: The Inside Story of the Brewing Industry's Bizarre Battles for Your Money (1997)	Philip Van Munching	Philip Van Munching	Audio Book Club Publishing	Winner	
2000 5th	Business @ the Speed of Thought (1999)	Bill Gates	Roger Steffens	Time Warner AudioBooks	Finalist	
2000 5th	Faster (1999)	James Gleick	James Gleick	Random House Audio	Finalist	
2001 6th	Rich Dad, Poor Dad: What the Rich Teach Their Kids About Money That the Poor and the Middle Class Do Not! (1997)	Robert T. Kiyosaki and Sharon L. Lechter	Steve Hoye	Time Warner AudioBooks	Winner	
2001 6th	The Invisible Touch (2000)	Harry Beckwith	Jim Ward	Time Warner AudioBooks	Finalist	
2001 6th	Irrational Exuberance (2000)	Robert J. Shiller	Robert J. Shiller	Random House Audio	Finalist	
2002 7th	Rich Kid, Smart Kid: Give Your Child a Financial Head Start (2001)	Robert T. Kiyosaki	Jim Ward	Time Warner AudioBooks	Winner	
2002 7th	Fish!: A Proven Way to Boost Morale and Improve Results (2001)	Stephen C. Lundin	Mallory Kasdan	Random House Audio	Finalist	
2002 7th	The Power of Six Sigma (2001)	Subir Chowdhury	Patrick Lawlor and Richard Allen	B&B Audio	Finalist	
2003 8th	The Art of Profitability (2002)	Adrian Slywotzky	Scott Mosenson and Jack Ong	Time Warner AudioBooks	Winner	
2003 8th	Execution (2002)	Larry Bossidy and Ram Charan	Larry Bossidy, Ram Charan, and John Bedford Lloyd	Random House Audio	Finalist	
2003 8th	Fish! Tales: Real-Life Stories to Help You Transform Your Workplace and Your Life (2002)	Stephen C. Lundin, John Christensen, and Harry Paul	Beth Chaplin and Carr Hagerman	Hyperion Audiobooks	Finalist	
2003 8th	Prophecy: Why the Biggest Stock Market Crash in History Is Still Coming...and How You Can Prepare Yourself and Profit From It! (2002)	Robert T. Kiyosaki and Sharon L. Lechter	Jim Ward	Time Warner AudioBooks	Finalist	
2003 8th	Throwing the Elephant (2002)	Stanley Bing	Simon Jones and Philip Bosco	HarperAudio	Finalist	
2004 9th	If You Don't Have Big Breasts, Put Ribbons on Your Pigtails: And Other Lessons I Learned from My Mom (2003)	Barbara Corcoran and Bruce Littlefield	Barbara Corcoran	Listen & Live Audio	Winner	
2004 9th	Cracking Your Retirement Nest Egg (2003)	Margaret A. Malaspina	Celeste Lawson	Blackstone Audio	Finalist	
2004 9th	Ready for Anything (2003)	David Allen	David Allen	Simon & Schuster Audio	Finalist	
2004 9th	What Clients Love (2002)	Harry Beckwith	Harry Beckwith	Time Warner AudioBooks	Finalist	
2004 9th	Who Says Elephants Can't Dance (2002)	Louis V. Gerstner, Jr.	Edward Herrmann	HarperAudio	Finalist	
2005 10th	Death by Meeting: A Leadership Fable About Solving the Most Painful Problem in Business (2004)	Patrick Lencioni	Jack Arthur	Audio Renaissance	Winner	
2005 10th	Customer Mania! (2004)	Ken Blanchard	Ken Blanchard	Simon & Schuster Audio	Finalist	
2005 10th	Goals! (2010)	Brian Tracy	Brian Tracy	The Audio Partners Publishing Corp.	Finalist	
2005 10th	Making Work Work (2004)	Julie Morgenstern	Julie Morgenstern	HarperAudio	Finalist	
2005 10th	Who Took My Money? (2004)	Robert Kiyosaki and Sharon L. Lechter	Jim Ward	Time Warner AudioBooks	Finalist	
2006 11th	Good to Great: Why Some Companies Make the Leap...and Others Don't (2001)	Jim Collins	Jim Collins	HarperAudio	Winner	
2006 11th	Leadership and Self-Deception (2000)		William Dufris	Audio Partners Publishing Corp.	Finalist	
2006 11th	The Martha Rules (2005)	Martha Stewart	Martha Stewart	Random House Audio	Finalist	
2006 11th	The Money Book for the Young, Fabulous and Broke (2005)	Suze Orman	Suze Orman	Penguin Audio	Finalist	
2006 11th	Why Business People Speak Like Idiots (2005)	Brian Fugere, Chelsea Hardaway, and Jon Warshawsky	Alan Sklar	Tantor Audio	Finalist	
2007 12th	The Long Tail: Why the Future of Business Is Selling Less of More (2006)	Chris Anderson	Christopher Nissley	Hyperion Audio	Winner	
2007 12th	Mavericks at Work (2006)	William C. Taylor and Polly LaBarre	Barrett Whitener	HarperAudio	Finalist	
2007 12th	Myths, Lies, and Downright Stupidity (2007)	John Stossel	John Stossel	Hyperion Audio	Finalist	
2007 12th	Silos, Politics and Turf Wars (2006)	Patrick Lencioni	Eric Conger	Audio Renaissance	Finalist	
2007 12th	Small Is the New Big (2006)	Seth Godin	Seth Godin	HighBridge Audio	Finalist	
2008 13th	Words That Work: It's Not What You Say, It's What People Hear (2007)	Frank Luntz	Frank Luntz and L. J. Ganser	Hyperion Audio	Winner	
2008 13th	Do You! (2007)	Russell Simmons and Chris Morrow	Black Ice	Penguin Audio	Finalist	
2008 13th	The Dream Manager (2007)	Matthew Kelly	David Slavin	Hyperion Audiobooks	Finalist	
2008 13th	The House of Mondavi (2007)	Julia Flynn Siler	Alan Sklar	Tantor Audio	Finalist	
2008 13th	How to Get to the Top (2007)	Jeffrey Fox	Jeffrey Fox	Macmillan Audio	Finalist	
2008 13th	The Tao of Warren Buffett (2006)	Mary Buffett and David Clark	Anna Fields	Tantor Audio	Finalist	
2009 14th	The Little Red Book of Selling: 12.5 Principles of Sales of Greatness (2009)	Jeffrey Gitomer	Jeffrey Gitomer	Simon & Schuster Audio	Winner	
2009 14th	Awakening the Entrepreneur Within (2008)	Michael E. Gerber	Michael E. Gerber	HarperAudio	Finalist	
2009 14th	Grammar Girl's Quick and Dirty Tips for Better Writing (2008)	Mignon Fogarty	Mignon Fogarty	Macmillan Audio	Finalist	
2009 14th	Mastering the Seven Decisions (2008)	Andy Andrews	Andy Andrews	Oasis Audio	Finalist	
2009 14th	Stirring It Up (2008)	Gary Hirshberg	Gary Hirshberg	Hyperion Audio	Finalist	
2009 14th	The Uprising (2008)	David Sirota	Lloyd James	Tantor Audio	Finalist	

=== 2010s ===
Business winners and finalists 2010-2019
Year	Title	Author(s)	Narrator(s)	Publisher	Result	Ref.
2010 15th	Rain: What a Paperboy Learned About Business (2009)	Jeffrey J. Fox	Jeffrey J. Fox	Brilliance Audio	Winner	
2010 15th	House of Cards (2009)	William D. Cohan	Alan Sklar	Tantor Audio	Finalist	
2010 15th	Too Big to Fail (2009)	Andrew Ross Sorkin	William Hugher	Blackstone Audio/Penguin Audiobooks	Finalist	
2010 15th	Viral Loop (2009)	Adam L. Penenberg	Richard Allen	Tantor Audio	Finalist	
2010 15th	What Would Google Do? (2009)	Jeff Jarvis	Jeff Jarvis	HarperAudio	Finalist	
2011 16th	The Intelligent Entrepreneur: How Three Harvard Business School Graduates Learned the 10 Rules of Successful Entrepreneurship (2010)	Bill Murphy, Jr.	L. J. Ganser and Fred Berman	Audible	Winner	
2011 16th	The 4-Hour Workweek (2007)	Timothy Ferriss	Ray Porter	Blackstone Audio	Finalist	
2011 16th	Buy-In (2010)	John P. Kotter and Lorne A. Whitehead	Tim Wheeler	Brilliance Audio	Finalist	
2011 16th	Delivering Happiness (2010)	Tony Hsieh	Tony Hsieh	Hachette Audio	Finalist	
2011 16th	Lead Like Ike (2010)	Geoff Loftus	Mort Crim	Oasis Audio	Finalist	
2012 17th	The Barefoot Executive: The Ultimate Guide for Being Your Own Boss and Achieving Financial Freedom (2011)	Carrie Wilkerson	Carrie Wilkerson	Oasis Audio	Winner	
2012 17th	23 Things They Don't Tell You About Capitalism (2010)	Ha-Joon Chang	Joe Barrett	Audible	Finalist	
2012 17th	Aftershock (2009)	David Wiedemer, Robert A. Wiedemer, and Cindy S. Spitzer	Christopher Kipiniak	Audible	Finalist	
2012 17th	The Blue Sweater (2009)	Jacqueline Novogratz	Jacqueline Novogratz	Audible	Finalist	
2012 17th	I'm Feeling Lucky (2011)	Douglas Edwards	Douglas Edwards	Audible	Finalist	
2012 17th	The Thank You Economy (2011)	Gary Vaynerchuk	Gary Vaynerchuk	HarperAudio/Dreamscape	Finalist	
2013 18th	Spy the Lie: Former CIA Officers Teach You How to Detect Deception (2012)	Philip Houston, Michael Floyd, Susan Carnicero, and Don Tennant	Fred Berman	Macmillan Audio	Winner	
2013 18th	A Capitalism for the People: Recapturing the Lost Genius of American Prosperity (2012)	Luigi Zingales	Jonathan Davis	Audible	Finalist	
2013 18th	Great on the Job (2011)	Jodi Glickman	Tanya Eby	Brilliance Audio	Finalist	
2013 18th	Inside Apple (2012)	Adam Lashinsky	Adam Lashinsky	Hachette Audio	Finalist	
2013 18th	The Personal MBA (2010)	Josh Kaufman	Josh Kaufman	Audible	Finalist	
2014 19th	Leadership Secrets of the Salvation Army (2012)	Robert Watson and Ben Brown	Bob Souer	eChristian	Winner	
2014 19th	The Everything Store (2013)	Brad Stone	Peter Larkin	Hachette Audio	Finalist	
2014 19th	The Invisible Heart (2001)	Russell D. Roberts	Kirby Heyborne	Audible	Finalist	
2014 19th	Leading Apple with Steve Jobs (2012)	Jay Elliot	Richard Davidson	Audible	Finalist	
2014 19th	Naked Statistics (2012)	Charles Wheelan	Jonathan Davis	Audible	Finalist	
2014 19th	Without Their Permission (2013)	Alexis Ohanian	Alexis Ohanian	Hachette Audio	Finalist	
2015 20th	A More Beautiful Question: The Power of Inquiry to Spark Breakthrough Ideas (2014)	Warren Berger	Michael Quinlan	Audible	Winner	
2015 20th	#GIRLBOSS (2014)	Sophia Amoruso	Sara Jes Austell	Penguin Random House Audio	Finalist	
2015 20th	Creativity, Inc. (2014)	Ed Catmull and Amy Wallace	Peter Altschuler	Penguin Random House Audio	Finalist	
2015 20th	Playing to Win: How Strategy Really Works (2013)	A. G. Lafley and Roger L. Martin	L. J. Ganser	Audible	Finalist	
2015 20th	Talk Like TED (2014)	Carmine Gallo	Carmine Gallo	Macmillan Audio	Finalist	

== Personal Development winners and finalists 1997–2015 ==
=== 1990s ===
Personal Development winners and finalists 1997–1999
Year	Title	Author(s)	Narrator(s)	Publisher	Result	Ref.
1997 2nd	101 Great Answers to the Toughest Interview Questions (1991)	Ron Fry	HighBridge Audio	Winner		
1997 2nd	How Good Do We Have to Be? (1997)	Harold Kushner	Random House Audio	Finalist		
1997 2nd	Make the Connection: Ten Steps to a Better Body and a Better Life (1998)	Bob Greene and Oprah Winfrey	Random House Audio	Finalist		
1998 3rd	The Rest of Us: Dispatches from the Mother Ship (1997)	Jacquelyn Mitchard	Penguin Audiobooks	Winner		
1998 3rd	The Gift of Fear (1997)	Gavin De Becker	Audio Literature	Finalist		
1998 3rd	The Girlfriend's Guide to Surviving the First Year of Motherhood (1997)	Vicki Iovine	DH Audio/Durkin Hayes	Finalist		
1999 4th	The Energy of Money: A Spiritual Guide to Financial and Personal Fulfillment (1998)	Maria Nemeth	Sounds True	Winner		
1999 4th	Making the Case for Yourself: A Diet Book for Smart Women (1997)	Susan Estrich	The Publishing Mills	Finalist		
1999 4th	The Worrywart's Companion (1997)	Kitt Weagant	Audio Literature	Finalist		

=== 2000s ===
Personal Development winners and finalists 2000-2009
Year	Title	Author(s)	Narrator(s)	Publisher	Result	Ref.
2000 5th	How Men Have Babies: The Pregnant Father's Survival Guide (1999)	Alan Thicke	Alan Thicke	The Audio Partners Publishing Corp.	Winner	
2000 5th	Eat, Drink, and Be Merry (2000)	Dean Edell	Dean Edell	HarperAudio	Finalist	
2000 5th	What Southern Women Know (That Every Woman Should) (1999)	Ronda Rich	Ronda Rich	Brilliance Audio	Finalist	
2001 6th	The Protein Power Lifeplan: A New Comprehensive Blueprint for Optimal Health (2001)	Michael Eades	Michael Eades	Time Warner AudioBooks	Winner	
2001 6th	Life Makeovers (2000)	Cheryl Richardson	Cheryl Richardson	Bantam Doubleday Dell Audio	Finalist	
2001 6th	Relationship Rescue (2000)	Phil McGraw	Phil McGraw	Simon & Schuster Audio	Finalist	
2002 7th	Self Matters: Creating Your Life from the Inside Out (2001)	Phil McGraw	Phil McGraw	Simon & Schuster Audio	Winner	
2002 7th	Life Lessons: Two Experts on Death and Dying Teach Us About the Mysteries of Life and Living (2001)	Elisabeth Kübler-Ross and David Kessler	David Kessler	Books on Tape	Finalist	
2002 7th	Shackleton's Way: Leadership Lessons from the Great Antarctic Explorer (1998)	Margot Morrell and Stephen Capparell	Richard Matthews	Books on Tape	Finalist	
2003 8th	Anyway: The Paradoxical Commandments (2002)	Kent M. Keith	Kent M. Keith	Putnam Berkley Audio	Winner	
2003 8th	Authentic Happiness (2002)	Martin Seligman	John Dossett	Simon & Schuster Audio	Finalist	
2003 8th	Men's Health Playbooks (2002)	Writers of Men's Health	Hank Jacobs and Nicole Fonarow	Random House Audio	Finalist	
2003 8th	Mozart's Brain and the Fighter Pilot (2001)	Richard Restak	Richard Restak	Random House Audio	Finalist	
2003 8th	What About the Big Stuff? (2002)	Richard Carlson	Richard Carlson	Hyperion Audiobooks	Finalist	
2004 9th	The Ultimate Weight Solution: The 7 Keys to Weight Loss Freedom (2003)	Phil McGraw	Phil McGraw	Simon & Schuster Audio	Winner	
2004 9th	Confessions of a Reformed Dieter (2001)	Ajay Rochester	Ajay Rochester	Bolinda Audio	Finalist	
2004 9th	If Mama Goes South, We're All Going with Her (2003)	Lindsey O'Connor	Lindsey O'Connor	Brilliance Audio	Finalist	
2004 9th	Love the Life You Live (2003)	Les Parrott and Neil Clark Warren	Chris Fabry	Tyndale Audio	Finalist	
2004 9th	The Present: The Secret to Enjoying Your Work and Life, Now! (2003)	Spencer Johnson	Dennis Boutsikaris	Random House Audio	Finalist	
2005 10th	The Happiest Toddler on the Block: The New Way to Stop the Daily Battle of Wills and Raise a Secure and Well-Behaved One- to Four-Year-Old (1970)	Harvey Karp and Paula Spencer	Johnny Heller	Recorded Books	Winner	
2005 10th	The Gift of Change (2004)	Marianne Williamson	Marianne Williamson	HarperAudio	Finalist	
2005 10th	Goals! (2004)	Brian Tracy	Brian Tracy	The Audio Partners	Finalist	
2005 10th	Simple Steps (2003)	Lisa Lelas, Linda McClintock, and Beverly Zingarella	Celeste Lawson and Lisa Lelas	Blackstone Audio	Finalist	
2005 10th	Today Matters (2004)	John C. Maxwell	John C. Maxwell	Time Warner AudioBooks	Finalist	
2006 11th	The Five Love Languages (1992)	Gary Chapman	Gary Chapman	Oasis Audio	Winner	
2006 11th	Hot Sex (1998)	Tracey Cox	Fiona Macleod	Bolinda Audio	Finalist	
2006 11th	Secrets of the Millionaire Mind (2005)	T. Harv Eker	T. Harv Eker	HarperAudio	Finalist	
2006 11th	Win Your Case (2006)	Gerry Spence	Gerry Spence	Audio Renaissance	Finalist	
2006 11th	Younger Next Year (2004)	Chris Crowley and Henry S. Lodge	Don Leslie and Rick Adamson	HighBridge Audio	Finalist	
2007 12th	For the Love of a Dog (2007)	Patricia McConnell	Ellen Archer	Tantor Audio	Winner	
2007 12th	Beyond Basketball (2006)	Mike Krzyzewski and Jamie K. Spatola	Mike Krzyzewski and Jamie K. Spatola	Hachette Audio	Finalist	
2007 12th	Goodbye to Shy (2006)	Leil Lowndes	Leil Lowndes	Listen & Live Audio	Finalist	
2007 12th	Letters to a Young Artist (2006)	Anna Deavere Smith	Anna Deavere Smith	Blackstone Audio	Finalist	
2007 12th	On Becoming Fearless (2007)	Arianna Huffington	Arianna Huffington	Hachette Audio	Finalist	
2008 13th	Fit to Live: The 5-Point Plan to Be Lean, Strong, and Fearless for Life (2007)	Pamela Peeke	Pamela Peeke	Macmillan Audio	Winner	
2008 13th	From the Heart: Seven Rules to Live By (2007)	Robin Roberts	Robin Roberts	Hyperion Audiobooks	Finalist	
2008 13th	Giving: How Each of Us Can Change the World (2007)	Bill Clinton	Bill Clinton	Random House Audio	Finalist	
2008 13th	Healthy Living from the Inside Out: Every Woman's Guide to Real Beauty, Renewed Energy, and a Radiant Life (2006)	Mariel Hemingway	Mariel Hemingway	HarperAudio	Finalist	
2008 13th	Merle's Door (2007)	Ted Kerasote	Patrick Lawwlor	Tantor Audio	Finalist	
2009 14th	You: Staying Young (2007)	Michael Roizen and Mehmet Oz	Michael Roizen and Mehmet Oz	Simon & Schuster Audio	Winner	
2009 14th	Happy for No Reason (2008)	Marci Shimoff and Carol Kline	Marci Shimoff	Simon & Schuster Audio	Finalist	
2009 14th	The Intellectual Devotional (2006)	David Kidder and Noah Oppenheim	Oliver Wyman and Helen Litchfield	Macmillan Audio	Finalist	
2009 14th	The Last Lecture (2008)	Randy Pausch	Erik Singer	HyperionAudio	Finalist	
2009 14th	What Shamu Taught Me About Life, Love, and Marriage (2008)	Amy Sutherland	Hillary Huber	Blackstone Audio	Finalist	
2009 14th	A Whole New Mind (2005)	Daniel Pink	Daniel Pink	Audible	Finalist	

=== 2010s ===
Personal Development winners and finalists 2010-2019
Year	Title	Author(s)	Narrator(s)	Publisher	Result	Ref.
2010 15th	NurtureShock: New Thinking About Children (2009)	Po Bronson and Ashley Merryman	Po Bronson	Hachette Audio	Winner	
2010 15th	The Birth Order Book (1982)	Kevin Leman	Wayne Shepherd	Oasis Audio	Finalist	
2010 15th	The Hip Chick's Guide to Macrobiotics (2004)	Jessica Porter	Jessica Porter and Dan Bernard	Tantor Audio	Finalist	
2010 15th	How to Instantly Connect with Anyone (2009)	Leil Lowndes	Leil Lowndes	Listen & Live Audio	Finalist	
2010 15th	Throw Out Fifty Things (2009)	Gail Blanke	Gail Blanke	Listen & Live Audio	Finalist	
2011 16th	Put On Your Crown: Life-Changing Moments on the Path to Queendom (2010)	Queen Latifah	Queen Latifah	Hachette Audio	Winner	
2011 16th	Good Discipline, Great Teen (2007)	Raymond N. Guarendi	Raymond N. Guarendi	St. Anthony Messenger Press	Finalist	
2011 16th	The Music Lesson: A Spiritual Search for Growth Through Music (2011)	Victor L. Wooten	Victor L. Wooten	Tantor Audio	Finalist	
2011 16th	Spiritual Partnership (2010)	Gary Zukav	Gary Zukav	HarperAudio	Finalist	
2011 16th	This Is Water (2009)	David Foster Wallace	David Foster Wallace	Hachette Audio	Finalist	
2011 16th	Zig Ziglar's Leadership by Success Series (2010)	Zig Ziglar	Zig Ziglar	Blackstone Audio	Finalist	
2012 17th	Prime Time: Love, Health, Sex, Fitness, Friendship, Spirit and Making the Most of All of Your Life (2011)	Jane Fonda	Jane Fonda	Random House Audio/Books on Tape	Winner	
2012 17th	The Courage to Be Free (2010)	Guy Finley	Sean Runnette	Tantor Audio	Finalist	
2012 17th	Don't Sing at the Table (2010)	Adriana Trigiani	Adriana Trigiani	HarperAudio	Finalist	
2012 17th	Fortytude (2011)	Sarah Brokaw	Sarah Brokaw	Macmillan Audio	Finalist	
2012 17th	iGetSlim (2011)	Tony Wrighton	Tony Wrighton	Puttenham	Finalist	
2012 17th	Money Secrets of the Amish (2011)	Lorilee Craker	Lorilee Craker	Oasis Audio	Finalist	
2013 18th	The Tao of Pooh (2012)	Benjamin Hoff	Simon Vance	Tantor Audio	Winner	
2013 18th	It Worked for Me (2012)	Colin Powell	Colin Powell	HarperAudio	Finalist	
2013 18th	Just One Thing (2011)	Rick Hanson	Fred Stella	Brilliance Audio	Finalist	
2013 18th	Naked at Our Age (2011)	Joan Price	Suzanne Toren	Audible	Finalist	
2013 18th	The Whole-Brain Child (2011)	Daniel J. Siegel and Tina Payne Bryson	Daniel J. Siegel and Tina Payne Bryson	Brilliance Audio	Finalist	
2014 19th	You Are a Badass: How to Stop Doubting Your Greatness and Start Living an Awesome Life (2013)	Jen Sincero	Jen Sincero	Tantor Audio	Winner	
2014 19th	Dream More (2012)	Dolly Parton	Dolly Parton	Penguin Audio	Finalist	
2014 19th	Fitness Confidential (2013)	Vinnie Tortorich	Vinnie Tortorich	Pistachio Press	Finalist	
2014 19th	Get the Guy (2013)	Matthew Hussey	Matthew Hussey	HarperAudio	Finalist	
2014 19th	Happy This Year! (2013)	Will Bowen	Will Bowen	Brilliance Audio	Finalist	
2014 19th	The Secret to Success (2011)	Eric Thomas	Charles Arrington and Eric Thomas		Finalist	
2015 20th	What I Know for Sure (2014)	Oprah Winfrey	Oprah Winfrey	Macmillan Audio	Winner	
2015 20th	Act Like a Success, Think Like a Success (2015)	Steve Harvey	Mike Hodge	HarperAudio	Finalist	
2015 20th	Autism Breakthrough (2014)	Raun Kaufman	Raun Kaufman	Tantor Audio	Finalist	
2015 20th	Becoming the Kind Father: A Son's Journey (2007)	Calvin Sandborn	Michael Puttonen	Post Hypnotic Press	Finalist	
2015 20th	Learning to Speak Alzheimer's (2003)	Joanne Koenig Coste	Pam Ward	Tantor Audio	Finalist	
2015 20th	Strong Mothers, Strong Sons (2014)	Meg Meeker	Marguerite Gavin	Tantor Audio	Finalist	

== Education winners and finalists 1997–2001 ==
=== 1990s ===
Education winners and finalists 1997-1999
Year	Title	Author(s)	Narrator(s)	Publisher	Result	Ref.
1996 1st	Kiplinger's Money-Smart Kids (1995)	Janet Bodnar	Janet Bodnar	Dove Audio	Winner	
1996 1st	The 10 Commandments of Making It on Your Own (1995)	Sam Grossman	Sam Grossman	Audioscope	Finalist	
1996 1st	How to Argue and Win Every Time (1995)	Gerry Spence	Gerry Spence	Ausio Renaissance	Finalist	
1997 2nd	Word by Word (1996)	Anne Lamott	Anne Lamott	Writer's AudioShop	Winner	
1997 2nd	Reader's Digest Word Power: Volume One (1995)	William Funk, Judith Cummings, and Cecilia Fannon	Efrem Zimbalist, Jr.	Dove Audio	Finalist	
1997 2nd	The Wonder of Boys (1996)	Michael Gurian	Michael Gurian	The Audio Partners Publishing Corp.	Finalist	
1998 3rd	The Stokes Field Guide to Bird Songs (1997)	Lang Elliot and Donald and Lillian Stokes	Lang Elliot and Donald and Lillian Stokes	Time Warner AudioBooks	Winner	
1998 3rd	Divine Singing: Chanting in the Devotional Tradition of India (1997)	Chaitanya Kabir	Chaitanya Kabir	Sounds True	Finalist	
1998 3rd	Kaplan's Word Power: Vocabulary Building for Success (1997)	Meg F. Schneider	Anonymous	Simon & Schuster Audio	Finalist	
1999 4th	French in a Box (1998)	Donald S. Rivera	Donald S. Rivera	Penton Overseas	Winner	
1999 4th	Commercial Speak (1991)	Hugh Lampman, Bettye Pierce Zoller, Bob Magruder, Jerry Houston, and Larry Woods	Hugh Lampman, Bettye Pierce Zoller, Bob Magruder, Jerry Houston, and Larry Woods	ZWL Publishing	Finalist	
1999 4th	Pimsleur Language Program: Spanish (1998)	Paul Pimsleur	Paul Pimsleur	Simon & Schuster Audio	Finalist	

=== 2000s ===
Education winners and finalists 2000-2001
Year	Title	Author(s)	Narrator(s)	Publisher	Result	Ref.
2000 5th	If You Can Talk, You Can Write (1993)	Joel Saltzman	Joel Saltzman	The Audio Partners	Winner	
2000 5th	How to Be Your Dog's Best Friend (1978)	Monks of New Skete	Michael Wager	HighBridge Audio	Finalist	
2000 5th	The Savage Truth on Money (1999)	Terry Savage	Terry Savage	B&B Audio	Finalist	
2001 6th	Patton on Leadership: Strategic Lessons for Corporate Warfare (1999)	Alan Axelrod	Bruce Winant	Simon & Schuster Audio	Winner	
2001 6th	101 Secrets of Highly Effective Speakers (1998)	Caryl Rae Krannich	Beth McDonald	Listen & Live Audio	Finalist	
2001 6th	Rush Hour Spanish (2000)	Howard Beckerman	Howard Beckerman	Berlitz Publishing Company	Finalist	
