= Geoffrey Fox =

Geoffrey Fox may refer to:

- Geoffrey Fox (died 1966), one of the police officers murdered in the Shepherd's Bush murders
- Geoffrey C. Fox (born 1944), professor at the Computer Science Biocomplexity Institute at the University of Virginia
- Geoff Fox (1950–2025), American television meteorologist
- Geoff Fox (footballer, born 1925) (1925–1994), English footballer
- Geoff Fox (Australian footballer) (1910–1971), Australian footballer
- Geoff Fox, CEO and founder of Fox Racing

== See also ==
- Jeffrey Fox, president and CEO of Convergys
