= Henry Lodge =

Henry Lodge may refer to:

- Henry Cabot Lodge (1850-1924), Republican U.S. representative and senator who argued against the League of Nations in 1919
- Henry Cabot Lodge Jr. (1902–1985), grandson of Henry Cabot Lodge, U.S. senator from Massachusetts, and candidate for vice president of the United States
- Henry S. Lodge (1958–2017), American internist and health writer

== See also ==
- Harry Lodge, cyclist
