= Paula Spencer =

Paula Spencer may refer to:

- Paula Spencer (journalist), American journalist and author
- Paula Spencer (novel), a 2006 novel by Roddy Doyle
