= The Right Fight =

2010 business leadership book

The Right Fight: How Great Leaders Use Healthy Conflict to Drive Performance, Innovation and Value
- Author: Saj-nicole A. Joni, Damon Beyer
- Language: English
- Subject: Business Management
- Genre: Non-fiction
- Publisher: HarperCollins
- Publication date: February 2010
- Publication place: United States
- Media type: Print (Hardcover, eBook)
- Pages: 234 pp
- ISBN: 978-0-06-171716-1
- OCLC: N/A
- Dewey Decimal: 618.2/4 19
- LC Class: RG525 .E36 1984

The Right Fight is a 2010 book about business leadership. The authors argue that leader's time is not always best spent trying to help people in teams work in peaceable alignment. In contrast, Joni and Beyer show that leaders who foster productive dissent—what the authors call "right fights"—help their companies reach peak efficiency. The book ranked #6 on 800CEOread.com’s Books to Watch List in March 2010 and ranked #21 on its Bestseller list in October 2010.

== Major sections and points ==
=== Part One: Alignment and Tension in Organizational Life ===
Leaders must introduce and manage right fights to create breakthrough performance, meaningful innovation, and lasting value

Chapter One – Alignment is Not the Whole Answer
Research demonstrates that tension is required for performance. Right fights can help leaders use tension for maximum benefits
Chapter Two – Three kinds of Fights Not Worth Fighting
There are all kinds of wrong fights. Decoding them is the first step to stopping or avoiding them.
Chapter Three – “Jack Sparr” Takes on a Right Fight
An example of a right fight fought right.

=== Part Two: Learn to Pick the Right Fights: The Right Fight Decision Principles ===
Chapter Four – Right Fight Principle #1 – Make it Material
Make it about something worthwhile, something that matters.
Chapter Five – Right Fight Principle #2 – Focus on the Future, Not the Past
Move beyond blame to possibilities.
Chapter Six – Right Fight Principle #3 – Pursue a Noble Purpose
People need to commit their integrity and passion to something bigger than the bottom line.

=== Part Three: Learn to Fight Right Fights Right: The Right Fight Discipline Principles ===
Chapter Seven – Right Fight Principle #4 – Make it Sport, Not War
Have rules and play by them.
Chapter Eight – Right Fight Principle #5 – Structure Formally but Work Informally
Set up the fight in your organizational structure, but work out the tensions through informal networks.
Chapter Nine – Right Fight Principle #6 – Turn Pain into Gain
People matter – everybody should grow in a right fight, even if they don’t win.
Chapter Ten – Conclusion
All successful organizations fight right fights. When you can manage the tensions consciously, and use the Right Fight Principles as your guide, you and your teams will reap extraordinary rewards.

=== Part Four: Tools: Tests for Identifying and Leading Right Fights ===
Chapter Eleven – Is the Challenge Worth a Right Fight?
Assessment Tool
Acknowledgements
Index

== Principles ==
This book shows how leaders can foster healthy dissent in order to achieve high performance, foster innovation, and groom the next generation of leaders. Done well, right fights bring out the best of human capacity. By contrast, wrong fights – or right fights that never happen – can transform high purpose into failure.

The first three right fight principles described in Part Two guide readers in recognizing right fights. These principles are:

1. make the fight material, with big enough stakes to motivate everyone
2. focus on the future, without apportioning blame for the past
3. make the fight about a noble purpose – such as improving the lives of customers

The last three right fight principles, covered in Part Three, are:

4. make the fight a sport with rules, rather than a war
5. Structure right fights through the formal organization, but create informal networks and coalitions to help good ideas triumph in spite of the hierarchy
6. Turn pain into gain by assuring that everyone, including the losers, benefits from the experience.

== Companies ==
Joni and Beyer include several case-study examples of leaders engaged in “right fights” in the following companies:

- Campbell Soup Company
- General Electric
- Southwest Airlines
- Disney
- Burlington Northern
- The Reagan and Clinton Administrations
- Wal-Mart
- Katy Independent School District
- Unilever
- Coca-Cola
- P&G
- Bayer Healthcare
- Shell Oil
- Microsoft
- Johnson & Johnson
- Acumen Fund
- BMC Software
- McKinsey & Co.

== Response ==
Publishers Weekly noted that “Joni and Beyer make a convincing and counterintuitive argument that instigating dissent, if done selectively, can produce big results.”

Booklist observed that the authors “present valuable, thought-provoking ideas and conclude with an assessment tool for determining if an issue is an appropriate candidate for a right fight.”

Warren Bennis, Distinguished Professor of Business, University of Southern California and author of On Becoming a Leader remarked that “Anybody in any organization who has any responsibility must read this book.”

Marshall Goldsmith, the NYT bestselling author of Succession: Are You Ready? and What Got You Here Won't Get You There noted that “Managing tension and conflicting ideas is but part of the equation. Using them to steer the organization toward success is the other part, which is often overlooked. In The Right Fight, Saj-Nicole Joni and Damon Beyer show us how to use conflict the right way!”

Doug Stone, coauthor of NYT bestseller Difficult Conversations: How to Discuss what Matters Most, observed that “The wisdom runs deep and the stories jump off the page. Joni and Beyer show us why alignment is not enough. Fighting the right fights right can be the difference between survival and extinction. This book should be at the top of any leaders reading list.”
