= Julie Morgenstern =

American author, speaker and consultant

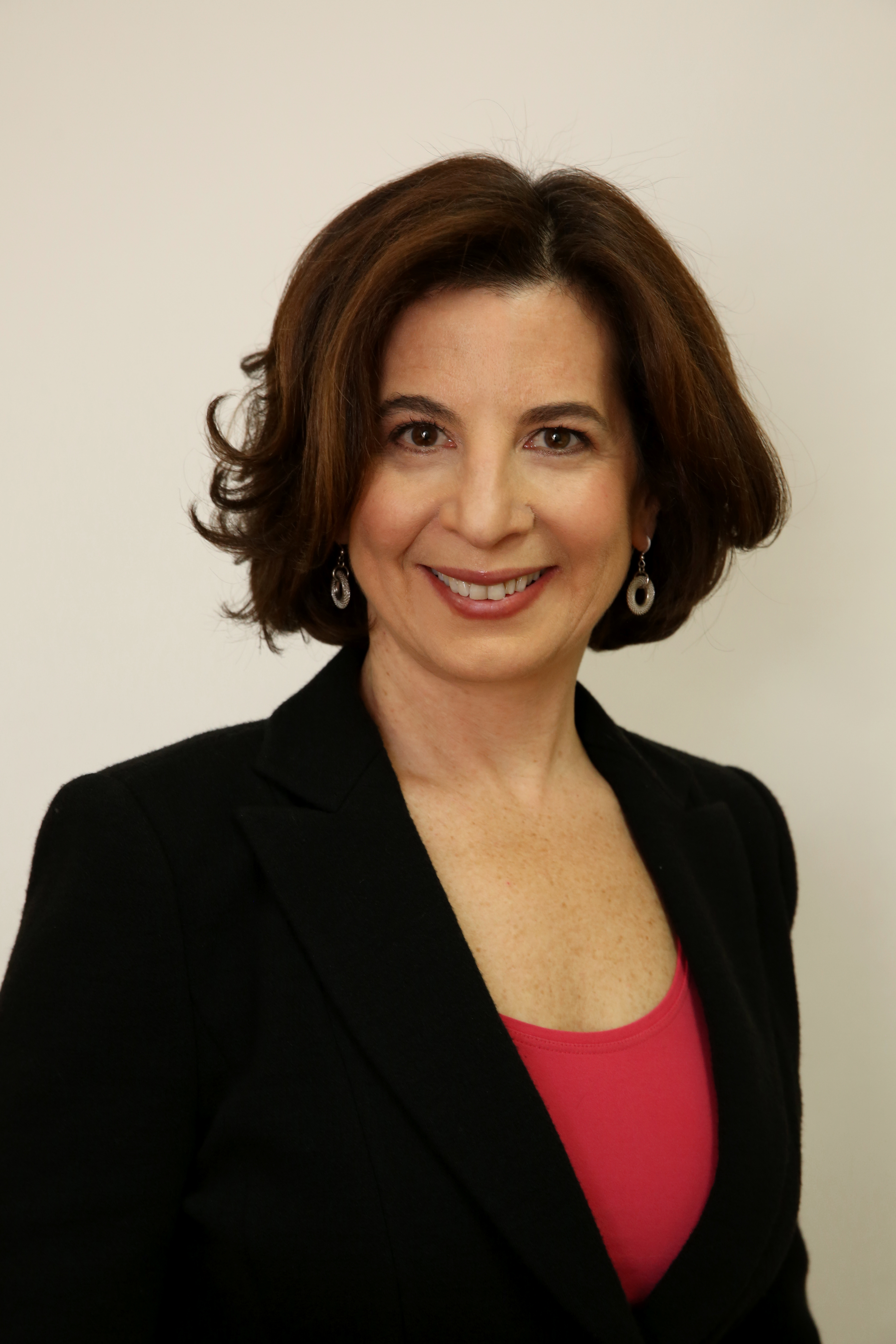
- Born: Philadelphia, PA
- Years active: 1989–present
- Notable work: Organizing from the Inside Out
- Website: www.juliemorgenstern.com

Julie Morgenstern is an organizing & productivity consultant, New York Times bestselling author, and speaker. For over 30 years, Julie has been teaching people all around the world how to design systems that free them to make their unique contribution. She is recognized globally for her thought leadership and practical insights that solve everyday problems in new ways. Her unique philosophies of Organizing from the Inside Out and Time Leadership, which fuel individual and collective productivity are the engine behind her services.

== Career ==
She is the author of Time Management from the Inside Out and Organizing from the Inside Out for Teens(Henry Holt), Never Check Email in the Morning and Shed Your Stuff, Change Your Life (Simon & Schuster) Her most recent book, Time to Parent: Organizing Your Life to Bring Out the Best in Your Child and You, released on September 4, 2018 by Henry Holt, a subsidiary of MacMillan Publishers, includes research, strategies and tips to help parents balance raising a child and living a fulfilling, adult life.

She has been interviewed on TV and radio outlets, including The Today Show, CNN, The Oprah Winfrey Show, CBS, Wendy Williams and Fox News. She has been quoted and featured in magazines and newspapers, including Forbes, Harvard Business Review, Cosmopolitan, The New York Times, Self, Time, Men's Health, Real Simple, Psychology Today, and Refinery 29

== Bibliography ==
Books Authored By Julie Morgenstern
Organizing from the Inside Out
Time Management from the Inside Out
Never Check E-Mail in the Morning
SHED Your Stuff, Change Your Life
Time To Parent
Organizing from the Inside Out, For Teens
