= Organizing from the Inside Out for Teenagers =

Book

Organizing from the Inside Out for Teenagers is a book for teenagers that teaches them how to organize their room, their time, and their life and is written by Jessi Morgenstern-Colón and her mother Julie Morganstern.

Her mother wrote the book Organizing from the Inside Out which is a book for adults on organizing.
