= Lawrence Bossidy =

American businessman and author (1935–2025)

Larry Bossidy
- Born: Lawrence Arthur Bossidy; March 5, 1935; Pittsfield, Massachusetts, U.S.
- Died: July 22, 2025 (aged 90); Ridgefield, Connecticut, U.S.
- Education: Colgate University
- Employer(s): General Electric (1957–91); AlliedSignal (1991–99); Honeywell (1999–2000, 2001–02)
- Notable work: Execution (with Ram Charan)
- Political party: Republican
- Spouse: Nancy Jo Rodhouse (m. 1956; died 2023)
- Children: 9

Lawrence Arthur Bossidy (March 5, 1935 – July 22, 2025) was an American businessman and author. He was CEO of AlliedSignal (later Honeywell) in the 1990s. Before that, he spent over 30 years rising through executive positions at General Electric.

== Early life and education ==
Bossidy was born in Pittsfield, Massachusetts, on March 5, 1935, and had a twin brother, Tom Bossidy. Bossidy worked at the family shoe store growing up, had dreams of being a Major League Baseball pitcher, and once had a summer job pitching baseball for a college league team in Quebec, Canada. When Bossidy was a high school senior, he had a 95+ mph fastball, and a scout offered him a $40,000 contract to pitch for the Detroit Tigers. However, when the scout came to Bossidy's house with a check, his mother would not let him in, insisting that Bossidy finish his studies at Colgate University. While at Colgate, he helped lead them to the 1955 College World Series; in 2009, Bossidy was inducted into their sports hall of fame.

Bossidy graduated from Colgate in 1957 with a B.A. in economics. He was a member of the Mu chapter of Delta Kappa Epsilon fraternity at Colgate. Bossidy was later conferred a honorary doctorate from Colgate.

== Career with General Electric ==
Bossidy joined General Electric in 1957. Bossidy started out in General Electric's financial training program. He stayed with General Electric for the next 34 years, rising in the company through a number of executive positions including chief operating officer of General Electric Credit Corporation from 1979 to 1981, Executive Vice President and President of GE's Services and Materials Sector from 1981 to 1984, and vice-chairman and Executive Officer of the General Electric Company from 1984 to 1991.

=== CEO of General Electric Credit Corporation ===
One of his most important jobs at General Electric was chief operating officer of General Electric Credit Corporation from 1979 to 1981. During his tenure as head, the subsidiary, founded in 1943, came into its own. Between 1979 and 1984, its assets doubled to $16 billion due to expansion into leasing and selling of heavy industrial goods, inventories, real estate, and insurance. The leasing operations also provided General Electric tax shelters from accelerated depreciation on equipment that GE developed that was then leased by the credit corporation. Dennis Dammerman worked for Bossidy at GE Credit and remembered that Bossidy "could be boisterous and a little unsettling to the insecure. He challenged everything. If you couldn't back up what you said, look out. But he also challenges himself."

=== Relationship with GE CEO Jack Welch ===
Bossidy had a long term business relationship with General Electric CEO Jack Welch that began in the late 1960s when Bossidy came to audit GE's plastics division where Welch then worked. Bossidy later worked for Welch when Welch became CEO at General Electric. "Larry is a quick thinker, who energizes others around him. When he gets behind an idea, he lights up a room," says Welch. "He has both the mental toughness as well as the broad perspective that is necessary to lead and deliver results."

Before joining AlliedSignal, Bossidy was a high level executive at GE. He was very close to GE CEO Jack Welch but left for Allied Signal because he was too close in age to Welch to be considered his successor (GE has a mandatory 65-year retirement age for its CEOs so somebody who is not a good ten years younger at the time of a CEO change would not be considered for the job).

== Career at AlliedSignal ==
From 1991 to 1999, Bossidy was chairman and CEO of AlliedSignal Corporation. He became Chairman of Honeywell Corporation when AlliedSignal acquired it in 1999. Allied Signal, well-known in the aerospace, aviation, and military industries, adopted the Honeywell name, as Honeywell's product diversity provided greater notoriety in the consumer market. Bossidy retired in April 2000, then returned in July 2001, following an unsuccessful effort by General Electric to acquire Honeywell; he retired from Honeywell again in 2002.

Bossidy was Chairman of The Business Council in 1997 and 1998. In 2002, he co-authored, with business consultant Ram Charan, the best-selling book Execution: The Discipline of Getting Things Done, and a follow-on book in 2004. Bossidy was a director of the pharmaceutical company Merck from 1992 until April 2007.

== Personal life and death ==
Bossidy married Nancy Jo Rodhouse in 1956; she died in 2023. The Bossidys have six daughters and three sons and thirty-one grandchildren. Bossidy lived in Ridgefield, Connecticut, and had a winter home in Palm Beach, Florida. He died of a heart attack in Ridgefield, Connecticut on July 22, 2025, at the age of 90.

== Works ==
- Bossidy, Larry; Charan, Ram (2002). Execution: The Discipline of Getting Things Done. Currency. ISBN 9780609610572.
- Bossidy, Larry; Charan, Ram (2004). Confronting Reality: Doing What Matters to Get Things Right. Crown Business. ISBN 1400050847.
