= Petrea Burchard =

American actress

- Born: Petrea Celeste Burchard
- Occupation: Actress

Petrea Celeste Burchard is an American actress. She is sometimes credited as Celeste Burch in the anime she appears in. Her most recognizable role to date is as the English voice actor for fictional character and space pirate, Ryoko Hakubi from the Japanese animated series Tenchi Muyo!.

== Biography ==
Burchard's acting career began on the stage, taking roles in prominent production companies including Chicago's Second City and Victory Gardens theaters. She has played various roles in television, film, and theatre. Petrea has been a guest star on NBC's ER, Passions, and The West Wing, and CBS's How I Met Your Mother, Joan of Arcadia, The Guardian, and The Young and the Restless. She is also the opening woman in the 1992 black comedy Death Becomes Her.

Petrea studied Shakespeare at Chicago Shakespeare Repertory and with John Barton and members of the Royal Shakespeare Company at the British/American Drama Academy. Her credits in Shakespeare include Antony and Cleopatra (as Cleopatra), Titus Andronicus (as Empress Tamora), The Taming of the Shrew, Measure For Measure, and Julius Caesar. She originated roles in the James Sherman plays "Mr. 80%", "The God of Isaac", and "The Escape Artist".

She is best known as the original English dubbed voice of Ryoko the space pirate in the anime, Tenchi Muyo!.

Burchard is also a writer. She has published two books, the novel Camelot & Vine, and a book of essays, Act As If: Stumbling Through Hollywood with Headshot in Hand, based on her column on the LA actors' website, NowCasting.com, called "Act As If".

She currently resides in Los Angeles with her husband, filmmaker John Sandel.

== Filmography ==
Live Action Roles

- Fracture (2007) ... Dr. Marion Kang
- Callback (2005)
- Death Becomes Her (1992)
- Four Friends (1981)

Anime

- Ai Tenchi Muyo!
- Tenchi Muyô! In Love 2: Haruka naru omoi (a.k.a. Tenchi Muyo: Tenchi in Love 2: Distant Memories) (1999)
- Tenchi Muyô! Manatsu no Eve (a.k.a. Tenchi the Movie 2: The Daughter of Darkness) (1997)
- Shin Tenchi Muyô" (a.k.a. Tenchi In Tokyo) (1997)
- Tenchi Muyô! In Love (a.k.a. Tenchi The Movie) (1996)
- Tenchi Muyô (a.k.a. Tenchi Universe) (1995)
- Pretty Sammy: Magical Girl (1995)
- Tenchi Muyô! Ryô Ôki OVA 1 and 2 (1993)
