= Jen Sincero =

American writer

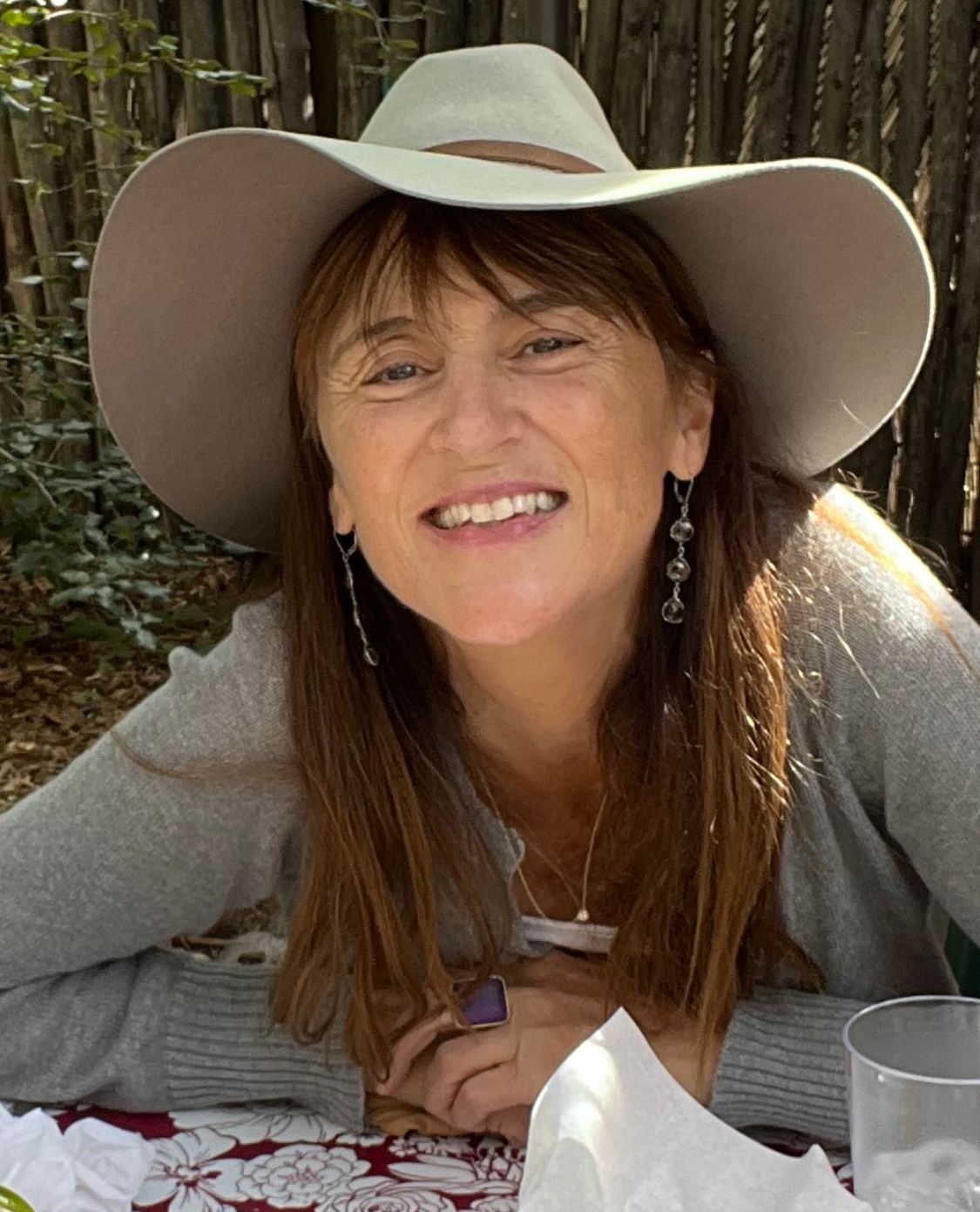
- Sincero in Santa Fe, New Mexico, 2021
- Born: August 7, 1965 (age 60); Westchester, New York, U.S.
- Known for: The You Are a Badass book series
- Website: jensincero.com

Jen Sincero (born August 7, 1965) is an American writer, speaker, and success coach.

== Early life and education ==
Jen Sincero was born and raised in Westchester, New York. She is the daughter of Italian-born Domenico Sincero, a doctor, and Susan Sincero. She attended Briarcliff High School and later Colorado College, where she graduated in 1987 with a BA in English. Sincero worked in the marketing department at CBS/Epic Records in the 1990s during which time she co-founded her first band, Crotch, Sincero moved to Albuquerque, New Mexico, in 1996, where she started the Jenny Clinkscales Band and later 60 Foot Queenie, a solo project.

== Career ==
In 2000, Sincero moved to Los Angeles, California, and worked as a freelance writer, writing marketing materials for the recording industry, magazine articles, blogs and performing spoken word. Her first book, Don't Sleep With Your Drummer (MTV Books, 2003) was a semi-autobiographical novel about a rock band. In 2005, she released her second book, The Straight Girl's Guide to Sleeping With Chicks (Simon & Schuster, 2005).

In 2008, Sincero began facilitating business development workshops for the women's entrepreneurial organization, Ladies Who Launch, and later started her own practice as a success coach.

Her third book, You Are A Badass: How to Stop Doubting Your Greatness and Start Living an Awesome Life (Running Press, 2013), has sold over 5 million copies, and has spawned follow-up books You Are a Badass at Making Money: Master the Mindset of Wealth (Viking, 2017), You Are a Badass Everyday: How to Keep Your Motivation Strong, Your Vibe High, and Your Quest for Transformation Unstoppable (Viking, 2018), and Badass Habits: Cultivate the Awareness, Boundaries and Daily Upgrades you Need to Make Them Stick (Viking 2020).

=== Honors and awards ===
In 2014, Sincero's narration of You Are a Badass won her an Audie Award, an annual award given by the American Audio Publishers Association for audiobooks and spoken-word entertainment.

In 2015, You Are a Badass became a New York Times bestseller, hit #1 and has remained in the top ten on the NY Times bestseller list for over five years.

Badass Habits was a finalist for the 2022 Audie Award for Business/Personal Development.

== Published works ==
- 2003 – Don't Sleep With Your Drummer (MTV Books)– ISBN 0743453913
- 2005 – The Straight Girl's Guide to Sleeping With Chicks (Simon & Schuster) – ISBN 0743258533
- 2013 – You Are A Badass: How to Stop Doubting Your Greatness and Start Living an Awesome Life (Running Press) – ISBN 9780762447695
- 2017 – You Are a Badass at Making Money: Master the Mindset of Wealth (Viking) – ISBN 0735223130
- 2018 – You Are a Badass Everyday: How to Keep Your Motivation Strong, Your Vibe High, and Your Quest for Transformation Unstoppable (Viking) – ISBN 0525561641
- 2020 – Badass Habits: Cultivate the Awareness, Boundaries, and Daily Upgrades You Need to Make Them Stick (Penguin Life) – ISBN 1984877437
