= Jeffrey Gitomer =

American author, professional speaker, and business trainer

- Born: February 11, 1946 (age 80); West Palm Beach, Florida
- Occupations: author, Motivational speaker, business trainer

Jeffrey Gitomer (born February 11, 1946, in West Palm Beach, Florida) is an American salesperson, author, and speaker who writes and lectures on sales, customer loyalty, and personal development.

== Education ==
Gitomer attended Temple University, but left after his first year to attend the Goethe Institute in Berlin, Germany, where he studied languages. The Charlotte Observer describes him as "a college drop-out who has built a sales training empire".

== Author/writer ==
Gitomer has written fifteen books, including New York Times best sellers The Sales Bible and The Little Gold Book of YES! Attitude. His most successful title, The Little Red Book of Selling, has sold more than five million copies worldwide and has been translated into 14 languages. It appeared on The Wall Street Journal best seller list at least 71 times. It was also chosen by business publishing experts Jack Covert and Todd Sattersten to be listed in their book of The 100 Best Business Books of All Time. However, in Time Magazine Andrea Sachs described his books in terms of P. T. Barnum, quoting Paul Argenti, a professor of corporate communication at Dartmouth, as saying: "People are looking for very simple answers to relatively complex questions". Sachs goes on to say: "Full of cartoons and bite-size nuggets of advice, the books are aimed at people who watch TV rather than read."

On September 16, 2006, three of Gitomer's titles appeared simultaneously on The Wall Street Journal best seller lists, the only business author to achieve this in the Journal's history. Gitomer has also co-authored three other titles with writers Ron Zemke, Greg Dinkin, and Nikita Koloff.

He also publishes Sales Caffeine, a weekly, multi-media e-zine, which is distributed internationally to 250,000 subscribers.

== Speaker ==
Gitomer is a frequent speaker at public and corporate seminars and as of 2007 was ranked in the top 1% of non-celebrity speakers by the National Speakers Association. On August 4, 2008, at the National Speakers Association Convention in New York, he was inducted into the Speaker Hall of Fame.

== US Airways Controversy and Resolution ==
Gitomer gained notoriety in November 2003 for being the first passenger ever to be banned from US Airways. The airline cited chronic, unreasonable complaints, numerous confrontations with employees, and verbal abuse that allegedly brought employees to tears. In an interview, Gitomer defended himself as a demanding, but not abusive, customer and explained that he had only made an employee cry once, several years prior. In October 2004, Gitomer was permanently banned as a customer and passenger.

== Personal life ==
Gitomer is married to Jennifer Gitomer, a sales coach.

In 2022, Gitomer put his 17,000 square foot condominium up for sale. The property, a former manufacturing facility called the Lance Cracker Factory, was priced at $12.9 million. At the time, it was the most expensive listing in Charlotte, NC.

== Honors and awards ==
- 2009 Audie Award for The Little Red Book of Selling. Awards recognizing distinction in audiobooks. Best Business/Educational title of the year.
- 2008 ASTD Award for Excellence in Workplace Learning and Performance, Solution Sales Elite, Hewlett Packard & TrainOne, partners.
- 2008 IPPY Axiom Book Award Gold Medal Winner in Sales for Customer Loyalty Concepts.
- 2008 National Speakers Association's CPAE Speaker Hall of Fame. One of 146 living members.
- 2005 IPPY Top 10 Outstanding Book Award "Business Breakthrough Book of the Year" for The Little Red Book of Selling.
- 1997 Certified Speaking Professional (CSP) Award by the National Speakers Association.

== Bibliography ==
=== Print ===
- Gitomer, Jeffrey (November 12, 2019). Get Sh*t Done: The Ultimate Guide to Productivity, Procrastination, and Profitability. Wiley. ISBN 978-1119647201
- Gitomer, Jeffrey (December 7, 2015). The Very Little but Very Powerful Book on Closing: Ask the Right Questions, Transfer the Value, Create the Urgency, and Win the Sale. Wiley. ISBN 978-1118986523
- Gitomer, Jeffrey (September 2, 2013). Jeffrey Gitomer's 21.5 Unbreakable Laws of Selling: Proven Actions You Must Take to Make Easier, Faster, Bigger Sales....Now and Forever. Bard Press. ISBN 978-1885167798
- Gitomer, Jeffrey (April 19, 2011). Little Book of Leadership: The 12.5 Strengths of responsible, reliable, remarkable leaders that create results, rewards, and resilience. John Wiley & Sons, Inc. ISBN 978-0-470-94457-8.
- Gitomer, Jeffrey (March 19, 2011). Social BOOM!: How to Master Business Social Media to Brand Yourself, Sell Yourself, Sell Your Product, Dominate Your Industry Market, Save Your Butt, ... and Grind Your Competition into the Dirt. FT Press. ISBN 978-0132686051
- Gitomer, Jeffrey (January 6, 2009). Little Teal Book of Trust: How to Earn it, Grow it, and Keep it to Become a Trusted Advisor. FT Press/Pearson Education. ISBN 978-0-13-715410-4.
- Gitomer, Jeffrey (October 21, 2008). Customer Loyalty Concepts: The First Interactive Thought Book. Charlotte, North Carolina: Lito Press. ISBN 978-0-9719468-0-4.
- Gitomer, Jeffrey (May 6, 2008). The Sales Bible New Edition: The Ultimate Sales Resource. New York: HarperCollins. ISBN 978-0-06-137940-6.
- Gitomer, Jeffrey (October 27, 2007). Little Platinum Book of Cha-Ching: 32.5 Strategies to Ring Your Own (Cash) Register in Business and Personal Success. FT Press/Pearson Education. ISBN 978-0-13-236274-0.
- Gitomer, Jeffrey (August 12, 2007). Jeffrey Gitomer's Little Books Collector Edition (5 titles plus CD). FT Press/Pearson Education. ISBN 978-0-13-236468-3.
- Gitomer, Jeffrey (April 14, 2007). Little Green Book of Getting Your Way: How to Speak, Write, Present, Persuade, Influence, and Sell Your Point of View to Others. FT Press/Pearson Education. ISBN 978-0-13-157607-0.
- Gitomer, Jeffrey (December 5, 2006). Little Gold Book of YES! Attitude: How to Find, Build, and Keep a YES! Attitude for a Lifetime of Success. Financial Times-Prentice Hall. ISBN 0-13-198647-3.
- Gitomer, Jeffrey (September 26, 2006). Little Black Book of Connections: 6.5 Assets for Networking Your Way to Rich Relationships. Austin, Texas: Bard Press. ISBN 1-885167-66-0.
- Gitomer, Jeffrey (March 10, 2006). Little Red Book of Sales Answers: 99.5 Real-world Answers that Make Sense, Make Sales, and Make Money. Financial Times-Prentice Hall. ISBN 0-13-173536-5.
- Gitomer, Jeffrey (September 25, 2004). Little Red Book of Selling: 12.5 Principles of Sales Greatness. Austin, Texas: Bard Press. ISBN 1-885167-60-1.
- Gitomer, Jeffrey with Koloff, Nikita (May 22, 2004). Wrestling with Success: Developing a Championship Mentality. Hoboken, New Jersey: John Wiley & Sons. ISBN 0-471-48732-5.
- Gitomer, Jeffrey (April 16, 2004). The Patterson Principles of Selling. Hoboken, New Jersey: John Wiley & Sons. ISBN 0-471-66262-3.
- Gitomer, Jeffrey (September 4, 2003). The Sales Bible Revised Edition: The Ultimate Sales Resource (perfectbound). Hoboken, New Jersey: John Wiley & Sons. ISBN 0-471-45629-2.
- Gitomer, Jeffrey with Dinkin, Greg (March 7, 2002). The Poker MBA: Winning in Business No Matter What Cards You're Dealt. Crown Business/Random House. ISBN 0-609-60986-6.
- Gitomer, Jeffrey with Zemke, Ron (May 1, 1999). Knock Your Socks Off Selling. Houston, Texas: AMACOM/American Management Association. ISBN 978-0-8144-7030-5.
- Gitomer, Jeffrey (May 5, 1998). Customer Satisfaction is Worthless, Customer Loyalty is Priceless. Austin, Texas: Bard Press. ISBN 1-885167-30-X.
- Gitomer, Jeffrey (October 18, 1994). The Sales Bible: The Ultimate Sales Resource. New York: William Morrow & Company. ISBN 0-688-13364-9.

=== Audio books ===
- Gitomer, Jeffrey. The Little Red Book of Sales Answers: 99.5 Real Life Answers that Make Sense, Make Sales, and Make Money. Unabridged. (Pub date: March 10, 2009) New York: Simon & Schuster
- Gitomer, Jeffrey. The Little Gold Book of YES! Attitude: How to Find, Build and Keep a YES! Attitude for a Lifetime of Success. Unabridged. (January 6, 2009) New York: Simon & Schuster
- Gitomer, Jeffrey. The Little Red Book of Selling: 12.5 Principles of Sales Greatness. Unabridged. (September 9, 2008) New York: Simon & Schuster
- Gitomer, Jeffrey. The Sales Bible New Edition: The Ultimate Sales Resource. Unabridged. (May 6, 2008) New York: Simon & Schuster ISBN 978-0-7435-7266-8

=== V-Books (video) ===
- Gitomer, Jeffrey. The Little Red Book of Sales Answers: 99.5 Real Life Answers that Make Sense, Make Sales, and Make Money. Unabridged. (Pub date: March 10, 2009) New York: Simon & Schuster
- Gitomer, Jeffrey. The Little Gold Book of YES! Attitude: How to Find, Build and Keep a YES! Attitude for a Lifetime of Success. Unabridged. (January 6, 2009) New York: Simon & Schuster
- Gitomer, Jeffrey. The Little Red Book of Selling: 12.5 Principles of Sales Greatness. Unabridged. (September 9, 2008) New York: Simon & Schuster ISBN 978-0-7435-7376-4
- Gitomer, Jeffrey. The Sales Bible New Edition: The Ultimate Sales Resource. Unabridged. (May 6, 2008) New York: Simon & Schuster
