= Matthew Kelly (speaker) =

Australian motivational speaker and business consultant

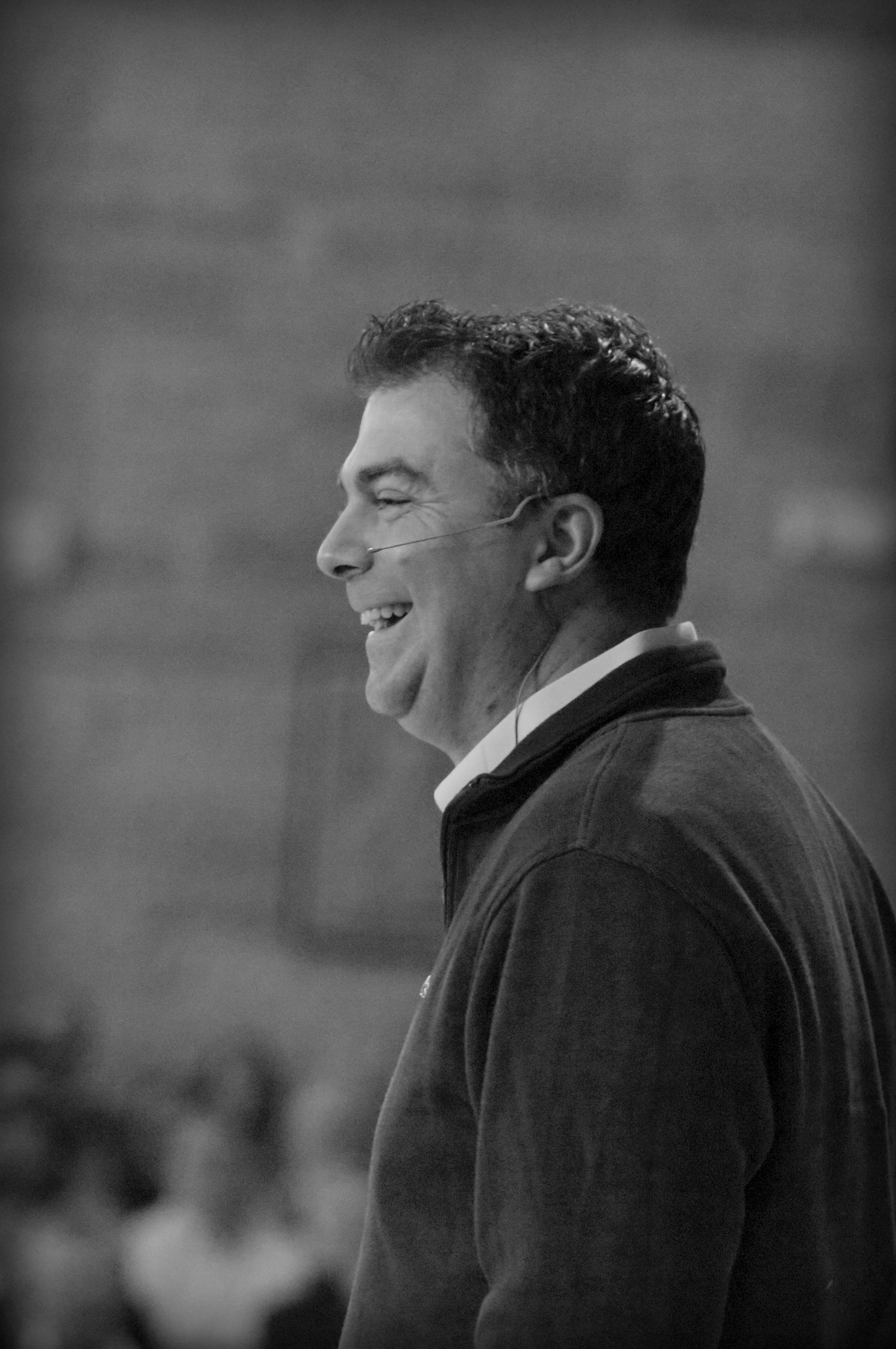
- Born: 12 July 1973 (age 53); Sydney, New South Wales, Australia
- Occupations: Motivational speaker, author, business consultant
- Spouse: Megan (m. 2009)
- Children: 5
- Website: matthewkelly.com

Matthew Kelly (born 12 July 1973 in Sydney, Australia) is an Australian motivational speaker and business consultant. He is a founding partner at Floyd Consulting, a management consulting firm.

== Early life ==
Matthew Kelly was born on 12 July 1973 in Sydney, New South Wales, Australia, and is the fourth of eight boys. He was raised Catholic, but was "restless and discontent" in his faith until his later teen years, when a family friend encouraged him to look deeper into his faith. This family friend, a physician, challenged him to spend ten minutes each day in a church in prayer. After a few days, Kelly was encouraged to go to daily Mass, where he began to connect more deeply with his faith.

== Personal life ==
Kelly married his wife Meggie in the spring of 2009. They have five children.

== Speaking and writing career ==
Kelly began speaking at the age of 19, while he was still in college. A professor recorded a speech that Kelly gave for 50 people in his business school, and then began distributing the tapes to other interested students. Since that time, his books have been published in 25 languages, and 12 of them have appeared on the New York Times, Wall Street Journal, or USA Today best-seller lists. His speaking engagements have included travel in more than 50 countries, where he has spoken to millions of people. In 1995, Kelly became the founder of and contributor to the Matthew Kelly Foundation, a charitable organisation. He is also the founder and CEO of Floyd consulting (formerly known as Beresford Consulting) and The Dynamic Catholic Institute.

Kelly's book Rediscover Catholicism (originally published under the title Rediscovering Catholicism) has sold millions of copies worldwide. Kelly's most recent works include a children's book entitled I Know Jesus and a compilation of thoughts entitled The Long View. as well as Beautiful Eucharist and The Rocking Chair Prophet.

In addition to his books, Kelly has produced a number of CD's and DVD's of his talks. He also consults with Fortune 500 companies as a part of Floyd Consulting and speaks at Living Every Day with Passion and Purpose events which are run through The Dynamic Catholic Institute.

== The Dynamic Catholic Institute ==
Kelly founded the Dynamic Catholic Institute in 2009, with the mission of "re-energizing the Catholic Church in America by developing world-class resources that inspire people to rediscover the genius of Catholicism." Since its foundation, The Dynamic Catholic Institute has distributed 5 million books through their book program. The Dynamic Catholic book program offers books, CD's, and other resources that promote spiritual growth to churches for $2–$3 apiece.

=== Criticism ===
While the Dynamic Catholic Institute operates as a nonprofit -- with supportive testimonials from numerous Catholic parishes across the United States -- it exists in a complex relationship with Kelly's for-profit enterprises. In 2020, at least three of Kelly's for-profit companies did business with Dynamic Catholic Institute: Beacon (Wellspring) Publishing, Floyd Consulting, and a limited liability company that owns the nonprofit's office building. Over the years, Dynamic Catholic has provided more than $48 million to Kelly's companies in book sales, consulting fees and rent. Estimates suggest that about 80% of every dollar donated to the Dynamic Catholic Institute is ultimately channeled to a for-profit company owned by Kelly. The large numbers of free books given away to parishes through Dynamic Catholic account in part for his status as a best-selling Catholic author. Kelly at one point occupied multiple spots on the Association of Catholic Publishers "Catholic Best-Sellers" list, by including books given away in bulk at speaking engagements as sales. These complex relationships are fully disclosed on the entity's tax forms in compliance with applicable law.

== Books ==
- Slowing Down to the Speed of Joy, Blue Sparrow Publishing, 2024. ISBN 978-1635825640
- 33 Days to Eucharistic Glory, Blue Sparrow Publishing, 2023. ISBN 978-1635825329
- Holy Moments, Blue Sparrow Publishing, 2022. ISBN 978-1635821352
- Life Is Messy, Blue Sparrow Publishing, 2021. ISBN 978-1635822007
- I Heard God Laugh: A Practical Guide to Life's Essential Daily Habit, Blue Sparrow Publishing, 2020. ISBN 978-1635821383
- The Culture Solution, Blue Sparrow Publishing, 2018. ISBN 978-1635820249
- Resisting Happiness, Beacon Publishing, 2016. ISBN 978-1942611912
- Rediscover Jesus, Beacon Publishing, 2015. ISBN 978-1942611196
- I Know Jesus, Beacon Publishing, 2014. ISBN 978-1937509859
- The Long View, Beacon Publishing, 2014. ISBN 978-1937509743
- Decision Point: The Workbook, Beacon Publishing, 2014. ISBN 978-1937509729
- Decision Point: The Leader Guide, Beacon Publishing, 2014. ISBN 978-1937509736
- The Four Signs of a Dynamic Catholic, Beacon Publishing, 2013. ISBN 978-1937509668
- Rediscover Advent, St. Anthony Messenger Press, 2011. ISBN 978-1616361648
- The One Thing, Beacon Publishing, 2011. ISBN 978-0984131884
- Rediscover Lent, St. Anthony Messenger Press, 2011. ISBN 978-1616362379
- Off Balance: Getting Beyond the Work-Life Balance Myth to Personal and Professional Satisfaction, Hudson Street Press, 2011. ISBN 978-1594630811
- Rediscover Catholicism: A Spiritual Guide to Living with Passion, Beacon Publishing, 2010. ISBN 978-1937509675
- Why Am I Here?, Beacon Publishing, 2009. ISBN 978-0984131808
- Perfectly Yourself: 9 Lessons for Enduring Happiness, Ballantine, 2008. ISBN 978-0345494528
- Building Better Families: A Practical Guide to Raising Amazing Children, Ballantine Books, 2008. ISBN 978-0345494535
- The Dream Manager, Hatchette Books, 2007. ISBN 978-1401303709
- The Seven Levels of Intimacy: The Art of Loving and the Joy of Being Loved, Fireside Press, 2007. ISBN 978-0743265126
- The Rhythm of Life: Living Every Day with Passion and Purpose, Touchystone, 2005. ISBN 978-0743265256
- Building Better Families – 5 Practical Ways to Build Family Spirituality, Ballantine Books, 2004. ISBN 978-1932631678
- The Book of Courage, Beacon Publishing, 2003. ISBN 978-1929266104
- The Shepherd: A Modern Parable About Our Search for Happiness, Beacon Publishing, 2001. ISBN 978-1929266074
- Mustard Is Persecution, Matthew Kelly Foundation, 2001. ISBN 978-1929266043
- A Call to Joy – Living in the Presence of God, Matthew Kelly Foundation, 1999. ISBN 978-1929266005
- The Rhythm of Life: An Antidote For Our Busy Age, Beacon Publishing, 1999. ISBN 978-1929266012
- Words From God, Harper Collins, 1997. ISBN 978-0646158297
- Our Father, Harper Collins, 1995. ISBN 978-0646229133
- The Biggest Lie in the History of Christianity. ISBN 978-1-63582-040-9
- The Forgotten Way: The Saint James Master Plan, Blue Sparrow, an imprint of Viident; c. 2025, Kakadu, LLC. ISBN 978-1-63582-590-9 (hardcover), ISBN 978-1-63582-597-8 (eBook); audiobook available from Audible.
