= Tony Wrighton =

British television and radio broadcaster

- Born: London, UK
- Occupation: Sports TV presenter
- Employer(s): Sky Sports, Virgin Books
- Known for: Sports TV presenting
- Height: 6 ft 1 in (1.85 m)

Tony Wrighton is a British television and radio broadcaster in the United Kingdom who has authored several books and audiobooks on a variety of wellness/personal development topics.

== Broadcasting career ==
Wrighton has presented on Longwave radio station, Atlantic 252, 105.4 Century FM in the North West, and Radio Aire in Leeds during the early 2000’s.

In December 2006, he made his debut as a presenter on Sky Sports News.

== Publishing career ==
Wrighton has authored nineteen books and audiobooks, in addition to producing a personal development app, The Gold Collection. and in 2010 he entered into a three-book deal with Virgin Books, part of Ebury Publishing. He also publishes on blogs and websites, including the Huffington Post.

== Books ==
- Wrighton, Tony (15 July 2010). Confidence in a minute. Virgin Books. ISBN 978-0-7535-2254-7.
- Wrighton, Tony (7 April 2011). Relax in a minute. Virgin Books. ISBN 978-0-7535-2255-4.
- Wrighton, Tony (1 September 2011). Persuade in a minute. Virgin Books. ISBN 978-0-7535-2256-1.
