= Ichiro Kishimi =

Japanese psychologist and philosopher (born 1956)

- 岸見 一郎

Philosophical work
- Notable works: The Courage to Be Disliked, with Fumitake Koga

Ichiro Kishimi (岸見 一郎, Kishimi Ichirō) is a Japanese philosopher and psychologist specializing in Western ancient philosophy and Adlerian psychology. Born in Kyoto Prefecture, he studied at Kyoto University but withdrew from the doctoral program in 1987 to care for his mother. Kishimi has taught at various institutions, including Kyoto University of Education, Konan University, and Nara Women's University. He co-authored the bestseller The Courage to Be Disliked with Fumitake Koga, which has sold over one million copies since its publication in 2013. Since 2017, he has been writing for Courrier Japon and overseeing special features on Adlerian psychology.

== Career ==
Kishimi was born in 1956 in Kyoto Prefecture. Kishimi graduated from Rakunan High School.

In 1987, Kishimi withdrew from the doctoral program at Kyoto University's Graduate School of Letters and Faculty of Letters, having specialized in the history of Western philosophy.

Kishimi was a part-time lecturer at Kyoto University of Education's Faculty of Education, Konan University Faculty of Letters, Kyoto Medical Association Nursing School, and Nara Women's University Faculty of Letters and worked at the psychiatric department of Maeda Clinic.

Kishimi was a part-time lecturer in psychology at Kyoto St. Catherine High School, Department of Nursing.

Kishimi was a counselor with certification from the Japanese Society of Adlerian Psychology and was an advisor to the Japanese Society of Adlerian Psychology.

Alongside his specialization in philosophy (Western ancient philosophy, particularly Platonic philosophy), he has been studying Adlerian psychology since 1989.

The book "The Courage to Be Disliked," co-authored with Fumitake Koga and published in 2013, became a bestseller, selling over one million copies.

In an interview with the "Chosun Ilbo" in July 2015, Kishimi criticized the Japanese media, stating, "The Japanese media has not reported on the phenomenon of my book becoming a bestseller in Korea."

Since June 2017, Kishimi has been writing a series titled "An Introduction to Philosophy from Age 25" for Kodansha's web media "Courrier Japon." In May 2019, he was responsible for the editorial supervision of a special feature titled "Changing Your Life with Adlerian Psychology: Ichiro Kishimi's World Advice Column."

== Personal life ==
During his graduate school years, he was unable to attend school for six months due to taking care of his mother. However, he recalls that during this time, he recognized the usefulness of philosophy through participating in a philosophy reading group.

In April 2006, he was hospitalized for one month after receiving arterial stent treatment for myocardial infarction. As his condition improved, many nurses would visit him for consultation outside their working hours.

In June of the following year, he underwent coronary artery bypass surgery.

From 2009, while caring for his father over a period of four years, he continued reading, writing books, and giving weekly lectures.
