= Trekonomics =

Book by Manu Saadia

Trekonomics: The Economics of Star Trek
- Author: Manu Saadia
- Language: English
- Genre: Science fiction
- Published: May 31, 2016 (Pipertext)
- Publication place: United States; United Kingdom
- Media type: Print (hardback & paperback)
- Pages: 280
- ISBN: 1941758754 13: 9781941758755

Trekonomics: The Economics of Star Trek is a 2016 book by French economist Emmanuel "Manu" Saadia. The book deals with the topic of the scarcity in the economy by looking at it in reverse. The author describes the 24th-century Star Trek universe in which scarcity does not exist at all. The book explores a post-scarcity age and how our society would need to change to adapt itself to such an environment. It looks at the expectations regarding automation and artificial intelligence and takes readers through a journey of the fictional, moneyless world of Star Trek. It also looks at the challenges to the Star Trek economy.

Saadia concludes that "Post-scarcity is not so much a matter of material wealth or natural bounty, but an organizational option for society".

In 2017 the Trekonomics audiobook was a finalist for an Audie Award in the "Business/Personal Development" category.

== Summary ==
Throughout human history, most people in the world had and still have to deal with scarcity of resources. Yet new technologies promising reduction or even elimination of scarcity are on the horizon. We must think about how to deal with this technological change. In the future of post-scarcity, we will not have to worry about money. We may not need to work to earn resources, which will be abundant, so we can escape from the fear of scarcity. Instead of that, we will work to get reputation and respect.

Star Trek is the most famous example of the post-scarcity society. Saadia analysed the economics of Star Trek, based on various comments and observations related to this aspect as seen in various episodes of the show. He asks the readers "What would the world look like if everyone had everything they wanted or needed?"

The author argues that while a warp drive may not be possible, post-scarcity economy is much more realistic.

== Structure ==
The first chapter focuses on Star Trek's universe (primarily, the United Federation of Planets, or Federation for short) and the absence of currency in it. In a society where the economic problems have been overcome, money is meaningless. It explains how that nation functions without the pricing mechanism and the results of eliminating money as both a unit of account and as an information signal.

The status of human labor in the Star Trek universe is the topic of the second chapter. The Star Trek universe is a utopia because people do not have to work, but yet the ones we see on the show are all paradoxically very busy. The motivations of people who chose to work are analyzed.

The third chapter talks about the replicator, the machine that makes Star Trek's post-scarcity possible. Post-scarcity's meaning is the infinite social wealth. The replicator is as a metaphor for automation, and an endpoint of the industrial revolution. Crucially, in the Star Trek's society it and its products are public good.

The fourth chapter focuses on natural limits of growth. In particular, it deals with the issue of whether resources are indeed limited, and how can different societies coexist if some view resources as limited and others, like the Federation, much less so. It also tackles examples to examine that Star Trek's universe follows the economic theory.

The fifth chapter is focused on negative externalities, such as whether different alien species (and their governments) can manage common resources. This chapter analyses the Star Trek-themed prisoner's dilemma game, and discusses whether rational and well-governed societies, like the idealistic and utopian Federation, can react appropriately when faced with an uncooperative foreign power. This chapter considers the theories of Elinor Ostrom who discusses methods of solving similar scenarios by using mutually beneficial collective action.

A simple history of Star Trek and Trekonomics is introduced in the sixth chapter.

The seventh chapter explains human behavior and nature. Some Star Trek characters, such as Spock and Captain Picard, are completely different from 21st-century humans. They live free from economic necessity, so they devote their lives to science and justice. The chapter highlights how economic behaviours and psychology change under the post-scarcity.

The eighth chapter deals with the Ferengi, an economically powerful alien species in the Star Trek universe, with an economy based on trade and capitalism. They are profit seekers, and all profit seekers can change. Deep Space 9, the third show, tells about how the Ferengi abandon their old ways and evolve into Keynesian social democrats.

The final chapter reveals how the Star Trek society already exists in some local and unevenly distributed forms. The expanding world prosperity, combined with the spread of public goods on a global scale, and the rise of "free" goods and services makes society approach ever closer to Trekonomics, the challenge being mainly distributional rather than technological.

== Factions ==
- The Federation: Humans are one of the main races in this political entity. Future humans, however, are completely different from the 20th century humans when it comes to a conventional way of living. The post-scarcity age has influenced them in a way where in some of their motivations they are nothing like us. Being untroubled by belongings makes them have no interest in conspicuous consumption. They are most likely interested in things of a much higher nature such as the cultivation of the mind, education, love, art and, of course, discovery.
- The Ferengi: These are imaginary extraterrestrial species that still charges money for the use of certain products, including replicators. They are a parody of the 1990s or 2000s American acquisitive businessman. The Ferengi are viewed as the lowest of the societies, primitive barbarians of the future, and seen as sad but funny at the same time. The Ferengi do change over time, due to contact with the Federation, and eventually we witness their transformation into Keynesian social democrats. Saadia thinks that the Ferengi becoming more humanitarian is a metaphor for us becoming better by watching Star Trek.
- The Borg: This is one of the most powerful extraterrestrial species. The Borg are one of the most efficient species in the Star Trek series and look a lot like the Federation. They have perfect allocation of goods, a perfect assignment to supply and demand. This is another society of the Star Trek universe that could be viewed as living in a post-scarcity economy. Every Borg drone has no needs or wants for anything; everything is provided by the collective of beings. Saaida thinks the Borg are a mirror image to what such a society could look like, but in a darker, dystopian form, and thinks the Borg society is a result of writers of Star Trek trying to incorporate criticism of the otherwise utopian society they present.

== Scientific analysis ==
Trekonomics, researched at the UC Riverside library, is largely a thought exercise in classic liberal political philosophy (e.g., doux commerce). Absent is a discussion of psychological science (e.g., social psychology). Of specific concern for scientists is social identity theory.

Social identity theory explains how the psychological process of categorizing people and things biases human decision-making. Humans evaluate members of their own in-groups more favorably compared with out-group members. A Science Advances article validates a computational model of political economy developed by Princeton political scientist Nolan McCarty to illustrate this point.

In the Science Advances article, the interdisciplinary team finds that when economic actors are allowed to take on meaningful social identities, these agents adopt a risk-averse, in-group favoring strategy consistent with social identity theory in psychology under conditions of economic decline or rising inequality. This is important because it leads to affective political polarization as a natural consequence of human cognition and capitalist organization. Political polarization is when people and groups (e.g., Democrats and Republicans) move apart emotionally or ideologically.

Trekonomics mainly focuses on the cultivation of human capital as a motivation for redistribution of productive resources. However, little attention is given to how the utopian Federation might address the evolutionary psychology of social identity theory and its consequences for economic and political behavior. This is important because in-group favoritism (e.g., home country bias) is incompatible with the assumption of orthodox macroeconomics that humans are rational maximizers of individual utility.

Trekonomics makes a passing reference to basic income as a potential tool to maximize human capital. This is important because recent research in management has called for renewed attention to the political and economic theory of universal basic income, specifically, both as a response to COVID and as an imperative for racial justice described by Martin Luther King, Jr. An emerging area of interdisciplinary research is the political psychology and economy of optimum currency areas.

Optimum currency area theory describes the conditions necessary for a region to benefit maximally from adoption of a common currency, as the European states have with the euro. One determinant of currency area performance is political solidarity, or the attachment of peoples to the states issuing a currency. Universal basic income may facilitate secure attachment of persons to states, increasing solidarity and decreasing polarization.

As money is canonically obsolete in the Federation, greater scientific attention must be given to the trekonomics of how currency areas might transition to a moneyless mode of operation. This may require consideration of basic income by scholars as a monetary policy, rather than a fiscal policy. As an institutional innovation, basic income may solve collective action problems caused by social identity (e.g., racism, sexism, or nepotism) in a manner consistent with classic liberalism.

== Critical reception ==
Johann K. Jaeckel writes that Trekonomics presents an unconventional contribution to the long-standing concern in economic thought regarding the impact of continuous automation on the role of human labor in social reproduction. Philip M. Duclos notes that the book discusses the utopian Star Trek universe, based on Gene Roddenberry's belief that "humans are indeed altruistic and can work together to improve the quality of life".

A New York Times review stated that Trekonomics can help us understand what it would take to create such a world as in Star Trek where technological advances would allow the whole society to lead more comfortable and meaningful lives, rather than the inequality that exists now which enriches only a few lucky people. A Washington Post review notes that the book goes deep into the better understanding of our economy and society without scarcity. Through that we can better understand how the society works under scarcity.

Trekonomics has inspired a fan-led Starfleet Party centered on advocacy of universal basic income as a path to the goal of the utopian future of Star Trek. An in-universe explanation for the Starfleet Party is that it is a predestination paradox.
