= Saj-nicole A. Joni =

American business person

- Born: Joni Abbey Shapiro; 1952 (age 73–74); Cleveland, Ohio
- Occupations: Business Consultant, Confidential CEO Advisor, Speaker, Author

Academic background
- Education: University of California, San Diego
- Thesis: Polynomials of binomial type : and the Lagrange inversion formula (1977)
- Doctoral advisor: Adriano Mario Garsia

Saj-nicole A. Joni (born Joni Abbey Shapiro, 1952) is an American author and business consultant.

== Education and academic career ==
Joni received her B.A. in 1973, her M.A. in 1975, and her Ph.D. in math in 1977 from the University of California San Diego. She was a doctoral student of Adriano Mario Garsia. Her dissertation was titled Polynomials of binomial type : and the Lagrange inversion formula.

At the age of 24, having completed her Ph.D., Joni joined the applied mathematics faculty of MIT, working closely with Professor Gian-Carlo Rota. She was instructor of applied mathematics from 1977–1978. As of 1980 she was a Visiting Assistant Professor of Mathematics. She was ranked as an assistant professor at MIT from 1980–1981.

Joni was also appointed to the mathematics faculty at Carnegie Mellon University as an assistant professor from 1978–1980, and for several years, she divided her time between these two universities. In 1978, Joni was honored by Carnegie Mellon University for excellence in teaching. For a number of years beginning in 1981, Joni was Assistant Professor of Computer Science and Mathematics at Wellesley College.

As a professor, her interests included "formal languages; combinatorial and algebraic solutions to automata-theoretic problems; [the] integration and intersection of feminist theory and mathematics computer science; [and] artificial intelligence."

== Career in business ==
From 1986 to 1998, Joni built her career as an executive in several high-tech companies, including a number of years building the commercial side of Microsoft, and as a business strategy consultant, leading the financial services sector of CSC Index as of 1997 as managing director of financial services.

In 1998, Joni established her CEO advisory company, Cambridge International Group, Ltd. Joni advises global CEOs and top leaders in the Fortune 500. She is currently CEO of Cambridge International Group, Ltd.

== Publications ==
Joni is an author, whose most recent book was Get Big Things Done with co-author Erica Dhawan, was published in 2015. It was nominated for an Audie Award in 2016. Previously, she wrote The Right Fight, with co-author Damon Beyer, Harper Collins, published in 2010. Joni’s first book, The Third Opinion was published in 2004. A frequent speaker with a regular column featured on Forbes.com, Joni has appeared on National Public Radio Marketplace, and has appeared in publications including The Harvard Business Review and Fast Company.
