= Joanne Koenig Coste =

Advocate for patients with Alzheimer's disease

Joanne Koenig Coste (2 July 1939 – 22 February 2022) was an advocate for patients with Alzheimer's disease and their families. She was the co-author (with Robert Neil Butler) of Learning to Speak Alzheimer's (Mariner Books, 2004, ISBN 0-618-48517-1) which has been translated into several languages and released internationally. She was named a "Woman to Watch in the 21st Century" by NBC Nightly News, was a recipient of the National Health Heroes Award from Reader's Digest, and was named Humanitarian of the Year by the Alzheimer's Association.

She was in private practice as an Alzheimer's families therapist, she lectured nationally, taught at Cambridge College (Boston), was a member of the board of the American Journal of Alzheimer’s Disease, and the President of Alzheimer's Consulting Associates which implements state-of-the-art Alzheimer care throughout the United States.

Joanne died February 22, 2022, at Brigham and Women's Hospital in Boston, MA.
