= Lorilee Craker =

American journalist

- Born: 1968 (age 57–58); Winnipeg, Manitoba, Canada
- Citizenship: United States
- Occupation: Journalist
- Known for: Through the Storm
- Website: lorileecraker.com

Lorilee Craker (born 1968) is a writer in Michigan, United States. She grew up in Winnipeg, Manitoba, Canada. She has three children. She advocates participation in community-supported agriculture and shopping at farmers' markets. She is an entertainment writer for MLive. Craker co-authored Lynne Spears' memoir Through the Storm. Craker and Spears appeared together at the 20th annual MOPS International convention in Grapevine, Texas in 2008. Craker co-authored My Journey to Heaven: What I Saw and How It Changed My Life with Marv Besteman, who died before the book was published. In a 2011 Time article, Zac Bissonnette writes that Craker "might be the most versatile journalist in America".

== Bibliography ==
- Byle, Ann (2006). The Making of a Christian Bestseller: An Insiders Guide to Christian Publishing. CSS Publishing Company. ISBN 1932902570.
- Fields, Leslie Leyland (2008). Parenting Is Your Highest Calling: And Eight Other Myths That Trap Us in Worry and Guilt. Crown Publishing Group. ISBN 978-0307446091.
