= Geoff Fox (Australian footballer) =

Australian rules footballer, born 1910

Personal information
- Full name: Geoffrey Kingsley Fox
- Born: 3 May 1910; Drysdale, Victoria
- Died: 8 August 1971 (aged 61); Australian Capital Territory
- Original team: Brunswick / Kinglake
- Height: 183 cm (6 ft 0 in)
- Weight: 77 kg (170 lb)

Playing career^{1}
Years	Club	Games (Goals)
1933	North Melbourne	1 (0)
- ^{1} Playing statistics correct to the end of 1933.

Geoffrey Kingsley Fox (3 May 1910 – 8 August 1971) was an Australian rules footballer who played with North Melbourne in the Victorian Football League (VFL).
