= Brian Klaas =

Political scientist and journalist

- Born: June 29, 1986 (age 40); Golden Valley, Minnesota, U.S.
- Education: Carleton College (BA); St Antony's College, Oxford (MPhil); New College, Oxford (DPhil)
- Occupations: Academic; author; columnist
- Writing career
- Subjects: Democratization, Chaos theory, American Politics
- Website: brianpklaas.com

Brian Paul Klaas (born June 29, 1986) is an American political scientist, a contributing writer at The Atlantic, and a professor in global politics at University College London.

He co-authored How to Rig an Election (2018) and authored Corruptible: Who Gets Power and How It Changes Us (2021) and Fluke: Chance, Chaos, and Why Everything We Do Matters (2024). Klaas was named one of the 25 top thinkers globally for 2025 by Prospect magazine.

== Early life and education ==
Klaas is from Golden Valley, Minnesota. He earned a BA (Summa cum laude) from Carleton College (2008), where he was elected to Phi Beta Kappa. He earned an MPhil degree in political science from St. Antony's College, University of Oxford. In 2015, he completed his DPhil in political science at New College, University of Oxford with his thesis Bullets over ballots: How electoral exclusion increases the risk of coups d'état and civil wars.

== Career ==
After completing his DPhil, he was a Fellow in Comparative Politics at the London School of Economics. In 2010, he was policy director and deputy campaign manager for Mark Dayton's successful bid for governor of Minnesota in 2010.

Klaas has been a frequent commentator in the media on US foreign policy and democratization. His articles have been published in The New York Times in 2015, The Financial Times, Foreign Affairs in 2016, Foreign Policy, the Los Angeles Times in 2017, and The Guardian in 2016, He appears regularly on MSNBC, CNBC, BBC, CNN and other outlets.

Klaas is a professor in global politics at University College London.

== Publications ==
- The Despot's Accomplice: How the West is Aiding and Abetting the Decline of Democracy, Hurst, 2016, ISBN 978-1849046879
- The Despot's Apprentice: Donald Trump's Attack on Democracy, Skyhorse Publishing, 2017, ISBN 978-1510735859
- How to Rig an Election, Yale University Press, 2018, ISBN 978-0300204438
- Corruptible: Who Gets Power and How It Changes Us, Scribner, 2021, ISBN 978-1982154097
- Fluke: Chance, Chaos, and Why Everything We Do Matters, Scribner, 2024, ISBN 9781668006528
