= Neil Rackham =

Author, consultant and academic

Niel Rackham
- Born: England
- Education: University of Sheffield
- Occupations: Author; consultant; academic
- Spouse: Ava Abramowitz

Neil Rackham is an author, consultant and academic. His writing focuses on "consultative selling," an approach he pioneered and documented in his book SPIN Selling (McGraw-Hill). Rackham has been a visiting professor at the University of Portsmouth, Cranfield School of Management, and the University of Sheffield, all in his native England, as well as at the University of Cincinnati, and is a frequent lecturer at conferences, business schools, and corporations around the world.

== Early life ==
Neil Rackham was born in England and spent some of his early years in Borneo. He was later educated at Totton Grammar School, Hampshire, England and then studied psychology at Sheffield University, where he was awarded a bachelor's degree in 1966.

He continued as a post-graduate research fellow in psychology at Sheffield through 1969, developing new tools to study and measure the role of interpersonal skills in successful negotiating and selling.

== Career ==
Rackham’s work as a research fellow led to his first books, The Evaluation of Management Training (Gower Press, 1970), written with Peter B. Warr and Michael William Bird; Developing Interactive Skills (Wellens Publishing, 1971), co-authored with Peter Honey and Michael J. Colbert; and Behaviour Analysis in Training (McGraw-Hill UK, 1977), with Terry Morgan. From 1970 to 1974 Rackham served as managing director of Performance Improvement Ltd. In 1974, he founded the Huthwaite Research Group, which later became Huthwaite Inc., a global research and consulting firm based in Northern Virginia, and, Huthwaite Ltd., based in the United Kingdom.

Having developed methods for measuring interactive behavior in his research fellowship, Rackham produced a series of seminal articles that focused on practices and behavior associated with successful negotiations: Deciding to apply these same methods to the world of sales and explore effective behaviors in successful business-to-business selling, Rackham sought the support of major multinational companies including Xerox and IBM, and raised an initial $1 million for a landmark study. The project, the first to scientifically measure selling and buying behavior, involved a team of 30 researchers who studied 35,000 sales calls in over 20 countries. The research spanned 12 years.

Appointed as the Patron of the Association of Professional Sales (since renamed to be Institute of Sales Professionals) in 2015.

From 2015 until 2020, Rackham worked with a team of 5 post-doctoral researchers at the University of Sheffield, in the Behaviour in Teams Research Unit, using AI and behavior analysis to investigate collaborative teamwork.”

== Publications ==
=== SPIN Selling ===
Rackham’s research led to a number of publications, with SPIN Selling released in 1988 and the SPIN Selling Fieldbook in 1996. SPIN Selling (abbreviated to Situation, Problem, Implication, Need-payoff) used research from the previous 12 years, focusing on how other businesses could use the method. Although SPIN Selling would go on to become a major success, Rackham has stated in interviews that the manuscript was initially rejected by several publishers. SPIN Selling has since gone on to be recognised as one of New York Times business bestsellers. In its list of the “Top 10 ‘How To Sell’ Books of All Time,” in 2013 Inc. magazine ranked SPIN®Selling No. 1, writing: ″Finally, this is the book that turned selling from an art into a science. While other sales books are heavy with anecdotes and assumptions, Neil Rackham examined hard evidence of actual sales performance and codified what works — and what doesn’t — in real world sales situations. A must-read for everyone who sells″

=== Managing Major Sales ===
Managing Major Sales (McGraw-Hill, 1991) with Richard Ruff

=== Major Accounts Sales Strategy ===
Rackham also authored Major Account Sales Strategy. Released a year after the publication of SPIN Selling, Major Accounts Sales Strategy builds on Rackham’s previous work to incorporate new strategies and tactics.

=== Other work ===
Rackham has also authored a number of other books on marketing, including: Getting Partnering Right (McGraw-Hill, 1996), with Lawrence Friedman and Richard Ruff, and the New York Times business bestseller Rethinking the Sales Force (McGraw-Hill, 2000), co-authored with John DeVincentis.

Rackham has written more than 150 articles on marketing, selling and channel strategy including “Ending the War Between Sales and Marketing,” co-authored with Philip Kotler and Suj Krishnaswamy for Harvard Business Review (2006),“Breadth of a Salesman,” with John DeVincentis, for McKinsey Quarterly (1998), and “Why Bad Things Happen to Good New Products” for the Journal of Product Innovation Management (1998).

== Consulting and teaching ==
Rackham led Huthwaite Inc. until 2003 and later became a strategic advisor to the firm he founded. Rackham was a visiting professor of sales and marketing at the University of Portsmouth from 2006 to 2015; a visiting professor of sales strategy at the Cranfield School of Management from 2008 to 2017; an executive professor of professional selling at the Carl H. Lindner College of Business at the University of Cincinnati from 2011 to 2016; Visiting Professor of Sales and Marketing Strategy, Edinburgh Napier University, Scotland from 2016 to 2019; and is a visiting professor of sales at the University of Sheffield since 2014. He has also been a guest or visiting lecturer at numerous U.S. business schools including Harvard Business School, Wharton, Kellogg School of Management, Darden School of Business, Kelley School of Business, Ohio University, and Purdue University.

== Awards ==
- Lifetime Contribution Award, University Sales Education Foundation, 2010, for outstanding contributions to professional selling
- Lifetime Achievement “Stevie” award, 2010, “for his unique contributions to the sales profession”
- Honorary Doctorate of Laws, Portsmouth University, 2009 “for his distinguished contributions to methodology, research and writing that have transformed our understanding of sales.”
- Innovative Contribution Award, Instructional Systems Association-The Association of Learning Providers, 2002
- Patron, Association of Professional Sales; Patron, Sales Leadership Alliance; Patron, Sales Performance Association; Honorary Fellow, Sales Performance Association
- Honorary Doctor of Science, University of Sheffield, 2017, in recognition of his internationally renowned research in many areas of business development including management training, sales and team-work
- Honorary Doctor of Business Administration, Edinburgh Napier University, Scotland, 2017.

== Personal life ==
Rackham lives in Northern Virginia with his wife, Ava Abramowitz, a professorial lecturer in law at George Washington University Law School. In his spare time, he writes poetry and science fiction, and his first book length work of fiction, A Telling Of Stones, was published in 2019 by Acair.
