= Inside Apple =

Book by Adam Lashinsky

Inside Apple: How America's Most Admired–And Secretive–Company Really Works
- Cover page on release date
- Author: Adam Lashinsky
- Language: English
- Genre: Business, economics
- Publisher: John Murray
- Publication date: February 14, 2012
- Publication place: United States
- Media type: E-book, Print (hardback and paperback)
- Pages: 223 pp
- ISBN: 978-1-84854-744-5

Inside Apple: How America's Most Admired–And Secretive–Company Really Works (also subtitled The Secrets Behind the Past and Future Success of Steve Jobs's Iconic Brand) is a business and economics book on the systems, leadership patterns, strategies, and tactics adopted by Apple Inc. The book was authored by Adam Lashinsky, who is the Senior Editor-at-Large for Fortune and a leading correspondent in Silicon Valley.

== Content ==
The book revolves around the past and future of Steve Jobs's famous brand Apple Inc. The book records the transition of the company in 1996, after the return of Steve Jobs when it had cash to remain solvent for only ninety days to the consecutive successes of the iPod, iPhone, and iPad, ending up in 2011, when the company was the largest company in the world.
