= T. Harv Eker =

Canadian-American writer (born 1954)

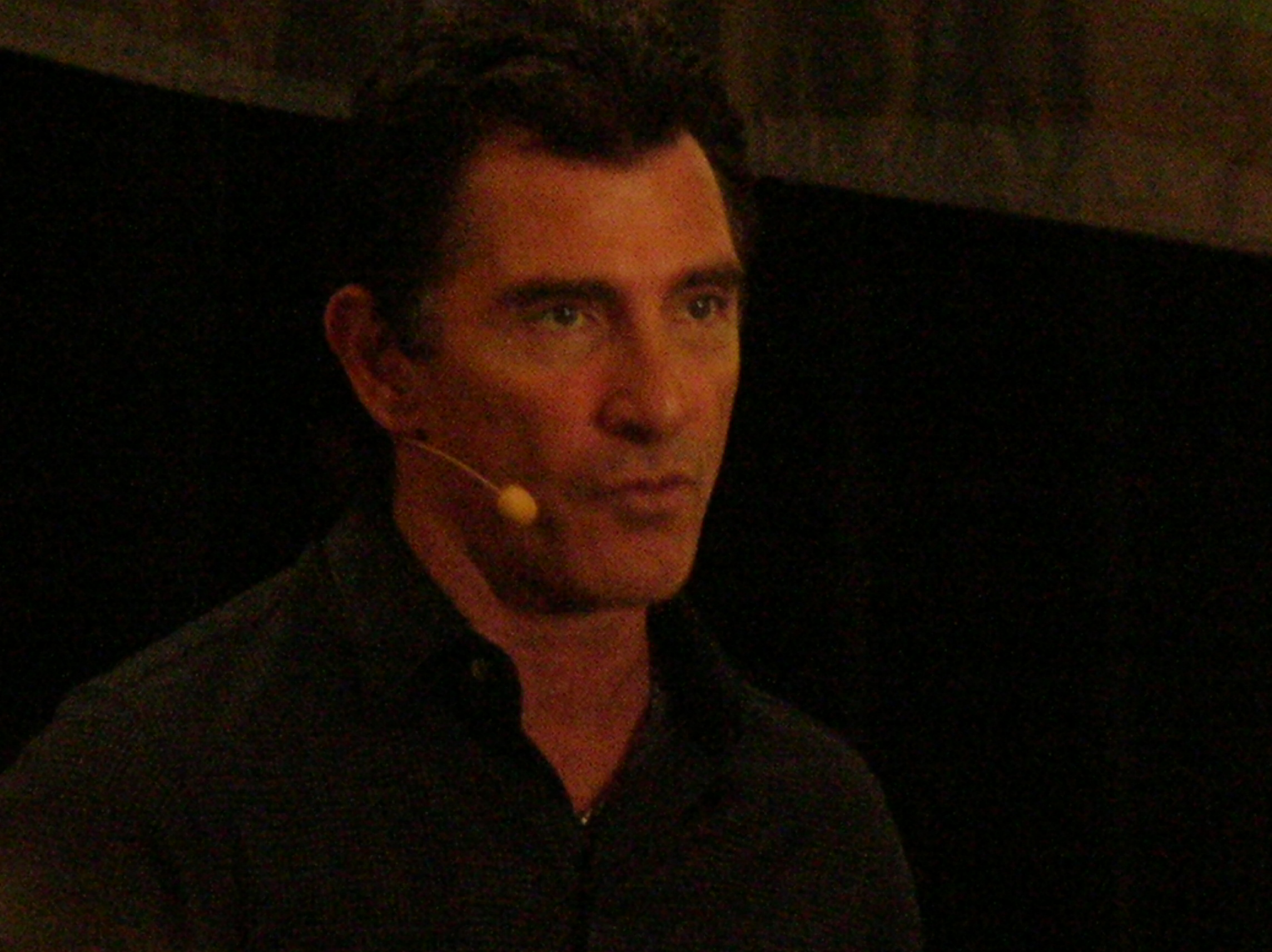
- Born: June 10, 1954 (age 71); Toronto, Ontario, Canada
- Occupations: Author; Professional Speaker; Trainer
- Children: 2

T. Harv Eker (born June 10, 1954) is an author, businessman and motivational speaker known for his ideas about wealth and motivation. He is the author of the book Secrets of the Millionaire Mind published by HarperCollins.

== Early life ==
Eker was born in Toronto, Ontario, and lived there through his childhood. As a young adult, Eker moved to the United States and started a series of over a dozen different companies before having success with an early retail fitness store. After reportedly making millions through a chain of fitness stores and subsequently losing his fortune through mismanagement, Eker started analyzing the relationships rich people have with their money and wealth, leading him to develop the theories he advances in his writing and speaking today.

== Theories ==
Eker's writing and speaking often focus on his concept of the "Millionaire Mind," a collection of "mental attitudes that facilitate wealth." This theory proposes that we each possess a "financial blueprint," or an "internal script that dictates how we relate to money," and that by changing this blueprint people can change their ability to accumulate wealth.

Other theories attributed to Eker include the concept that people unwilling to make major sacrifices in order to succeed "play the role" of the victim and deny that they have control of their own situations. Another concept is that guilt prevents seeking wealth and that "thinking about wealth as a means to help others" relieves this guilt and enables wealth accumulation.

In his book, Eker lists 17 ways in which the financial blueprints of the rich differ from those of the poor and the middle-class. One theme identified in this list is that the rich discard limiting beliefs while the unsuccessful succumb to them. Eker argues that: Rich people believe, "I create my life", while poor people believe, "Life happens to me"; rich people focus on opportunities while poor people focus on obstacles; and rich people admire other rich and successful people whereas poor people resent rich and successful people.

== Businessman ==
Eker founded the seminar company, Peak Potentials Training. According to a Peak Potentials press release, the company was later acquired by Success Resources, an event production company, in 2011.

Eker has produced seminars since at least 2001. A 2005 The Wall Street Journal article cites Eker as an example of changes in non-fiction publishing. The WSJ article examined his use of his seminars, contacts, and personal following as a "platform" from which to promote sales of his own book.

== Author ==
Eker is the author of Secrets of the Millionaire Mind which appeared on the New York Times bestseller list and was #1 on the Wall Street Journal's business-book list. He has also written a self-published book titled SpeedWealth.

== Controversy ==
A 2010 report in the Vancouver Sun claimed that Eker was named in a "prospective class-action lawsuit" involving two individuals who purchased residential properties from people they met while attending one of his seminars. Another Vancouver Sun report from 2007 cites a claim that Eker's company Peak Potentials Training Inc. used "high-pressure sales tactics" during "Millionaire Mind Intensive" course at the Wall Centre in October 2005. The plaintiffs alleged that Eker and his company violated the Canadian Consumer Act through wide variability in the pricing of seminar attendance.
