= Michael Gerber (non-fiction writer) =

American author and founder of Michael E (born 1936)

Michael E. Gerber
- Born: Michael E. Gerber; 20 June 1936 (age 90)
- Occupation: author
- Website: https://www.emyth.com

Michael E. Gerber (born June 20, 1936) is an American author and founder of Michael E. Gerber Companies, a business skills training company based in Carlsbad, California.

== Biography ==
Michael E. Gerber was born on June 20, 1936, in Elizabeth, NJ. He was the son of Harry Gerber (a furniture salesman) and Helen Gary Gerber Aaron.

With his first wife, Diana Duncan, Gerber had two children, Axel & Kim. With his second wife, Susan Arndt, he had his middle child, Hillary. He married his third wife, Ilene (a partner and shareholder in E-Myth Worldwide) in 1985, with whom he had his last two children, Sam and Olivia. Gerber was remarried to Luz Delia, his fourth wife, in 2006. Luz Delia Gerber was born March 4, 1948.

== Writings ==
The E-Myth (1986) ASIN B004KIC420

Power Point (1992) ISBN 978-0-88730-536-8

The E-Myth Revisited (1995) ISBN 978-0-88730-728-7

E-Myth Mastery (2005) ISBN 978-0-06-072323-1

Awakening the Entrepreneur Within (2008) ISBN 978-0-06-156814-5

The E-Myth Enterprise (2009) ISBN 978-0-06-173369-7

The Most Successful Small Business in The World (2010) ISBN 978-0-470-50362-1

== E-Myth Vertical Series ==
The E-Myth Manager (1998) ISBN 978-0-88730-959-5

The E-Myth Contractor (2003) ISBN 978-0-06-093846-8

The E-Myth Physician (2003) ISBN 978-0-06-093840-6

The E-Myth Attorney (2010) ISBN 978-0-470-50365-2 (Co-authored)

The E-Myth Accountant (2011) ISBN 978-0-470-50366-9 (Co-authored)

The E-Myth Optometrist (2011) ISBN 978-0-9835001-1-7 (Co-authored)

The E-Myth Chiropractor (2011) ISBN 978-0-9835001-3-1 (Co-authored)

The E-Myth Financial Advisor (2011) ISBN 978-0-9835001-5-5 (Co-authored)

The E-Myth Landscape Contractor (2011) ISBN 978-0-9835001-7-9 (Co-authored)

The E-Myth Architect (2012) ISBN 978-0-9835001-9-3 (Co-authored)

The E-Myth Real Estate Brokerage (2012) ISBN 978-0-9835542-9-5 (Co-authored)

The E-Myth Insurance Store (2013) ISBN 978-1-61835-008-4 (Co-authored)

The E-Myth Dentist (2014) ISBN 978-1-61835-025-1 (Co-authored)

The E-Myth Nutritionist (2014) ISBN 978-1-61835-029-9 (Co-authored)

The E-Myth Bookkeeper (2014) ISBN 978-1-61835-014-5 (Co-authored)

== Awards and honors ==
Named World's Number One Small Business Guru, Inc. Magazine; and Lifetime Achievement Award, National Academy of Bestselling Authors, 2010.

== Events ==
In 2019, Michael Gerber, alongside Ken Goodrich, presented the opening keynote at the Service World Expo in Las Vegas. The conference was the biggest in HVAC history and saw the launch of Gerber and Goodrich's joint work, E-Myth HVAC Contractor.
