= Michael LeBoeuf =

American business author

Michael LeBoeuf is an American business author and former management professor at the University of New Orleans.

== Biography ==
His eight books have been published in over a dozen different languages, serialized in magazines and newspapers worldwide and adapted to produce 16 different audio and video cassette programs. LeBoeuf is also a consultant, and frequently speaks to businesses of all sizes ranging from Fortune 500 companies to small banks and medical practices.

LeBoeuf is a professor emeritus at the University of New Orleans, where he taught for 20 years before retiring in 1989.

== Bibliography ==
- Working Smart
- Imagineering
- The Productivity Challenge: How to Make It Work for America and You (1982)
- GMP: The Greatest Management Principle in the World
- The Millionaire in You
- The Perfect Business
- How to Win Customers and Keep them for Life
