= Carmine Gallo =

American author, columnist, keynote speaker, and former journalist and news anchor

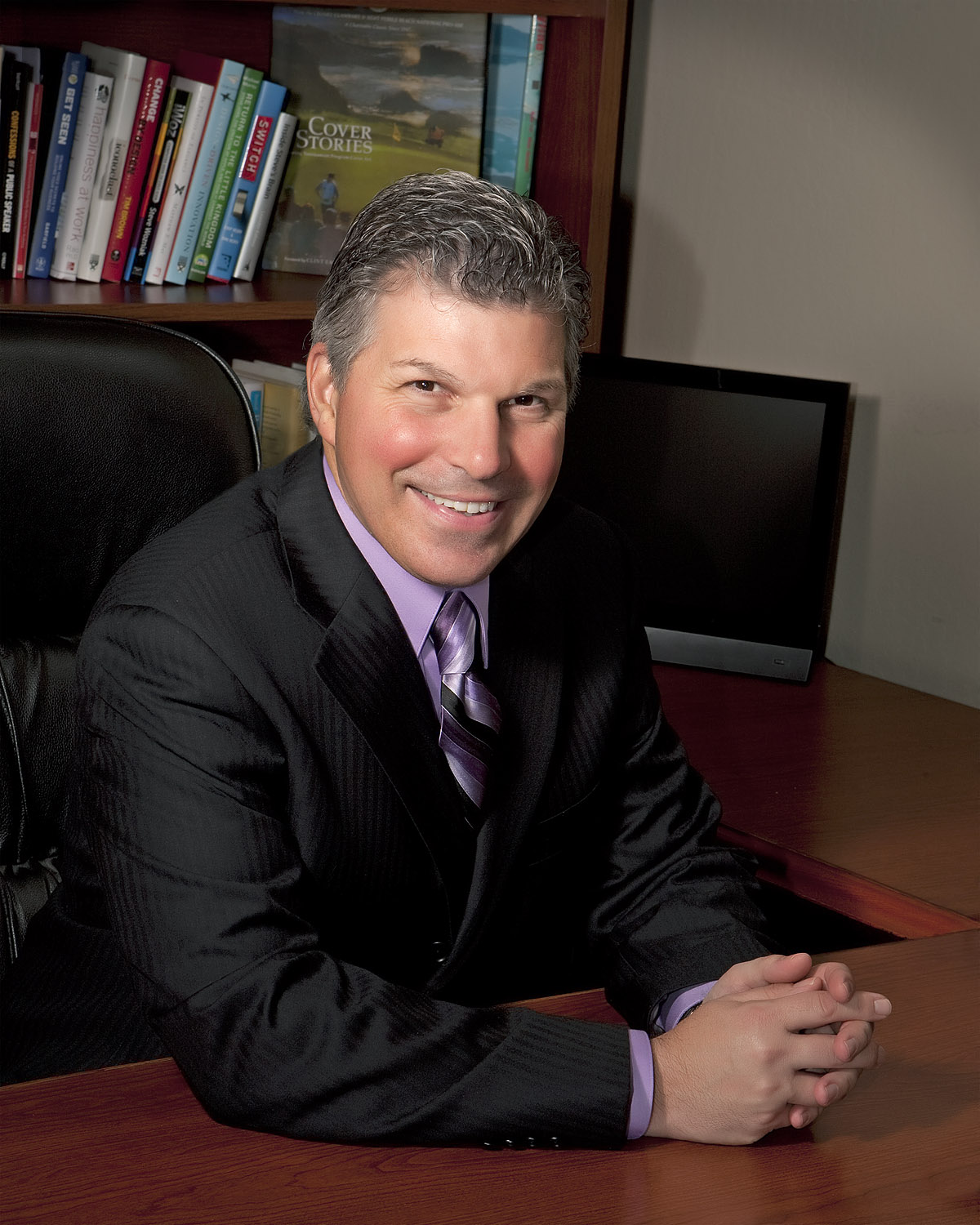
- Gallo in 2010
- Born: July 26, 1965 (age 61); San Jose, California, USA
- Education: University of California Los Angeles, BA Medill School of Journalism, MS
- Occupations: President, author, communications expert and coach, journalist, keynote speaker, news and business correspondent
- Agent: BrightSight Group
- Website: carminegallo.com

Carmine Gallo (born July 26, 1965) is an American author, columnist, keynote speaker, and former journalist and news anchor. Based in Pleasanton, California, he is President of Gallo Communications Group and works as a communication coach and speaker. Carmine is also a contributor for Forbes.com, where he writes for the Leadership Channel. He is regarded as an expert in his field in business communication and leadership skills. Gallo has been featured in The Wall Street Journal, The New York Times, Success Magazine, Bloomberg Businessweek and on CNBC. Gallo has also given lectures to MBA students at Stanford, UCLA, and UC Berkeley.

== Personal life ==
Carmine Gallo was born in San Jose, California, the son of Francesco Gallo, an Italian immigrant who was held in a British concentration camp until the end of World War II. After returning to Italy, Franco married Giuseppina Gugliemo, his childhood sweetheart. In 1956, they moved to America where Franco worked as an engineer for Palo Alto-based Varian Associates for more than thirty years.

In 1983, Carmine graduated from Bellarmine College Preparatory, in San Jose, CA. He went on to attend the University of California Los Angeles where he majored in Political Science. He graduated cum laude in 1988 with a BA degree. He then received his MS in Broadcast Journalism from the Medill School of Journalism at Northwestern University in 1989.

== Career ==
=== Broadcaster and Columnist ===
In 1996, Gallo was hired as a correspondent for CNNfn in New York City, a network dedicated to covering financial markets and business news. In 1998, he accepted a hosting position at The Money Machine, a daily half-hour program on the San Francisco-based network ZDTV, later renamed Tech TV.

He left Tech TV in 2001 to begin building his own media training practice, but continued to work as a journalist. In 2003 he was hired by CBS 2 (KCAL 9) Los Angeles to cover the Arnold Schwarzenegger administration and news events in northern California. In 2005 he became Vice President of Media Relations at Ketchum Inc., a San Francisco public relations and marketing company. In 2009, he left Ketchum to focus on his consulting practice. At this time, he began writing his first book and started speaking to corporations about business communications. From 2008 to 2011 he hosted The Useful Commute, a podcast that featured current management and marketing topics on BNET, an on-line news magazine that was a unit of CBS interactive.

In 2010, Gallo became a regular contributor for Forbes.com. His column, "Your Communications Coach," is focused on articles and videos about success, leadership and communications. Carmine also contributes articles to Entrepreneur.com and is a Thought Leader on Monster.com.

=== Speaker and Media Trainer ===
In 2004 he formed Gallo Communications Group in Pleasanton, CA, with his wife, Vanessa Gallo.

In 2010, Gallo Communications Group went into partnership with eVision-Design, Inc. a San Francisco–based e-learning developer to begin the Carmine Gallo Academy, LLC., an e-learning company where customers can take on-line, interactive courses on business communications. The first course, The New Rules of Persuasive Presentations: Sell Your Ideas the Steve Jobs Way, was released to the public in the summer of 2012 and is based on Gallo's book, The Presentation Secrets of Steve Jobs.

== Author ==
His best-known books are those about the late, Apple, Inc. co-founder, Steve Jobs. The first book in the series, The Presentation Secrets of Steve Jobs became a Wall Street Journal bestseller and, according to WorldCat, is held in 917 libraries The book has been translated into more than 20 languages.

The second, The Innovation Secrets of Steve Jobs, also became an international bestselling book and was awarded the Axiom Award for being one of the top three best business books of 2011. The third book, Gallo's most recent, is The Apple Experience, It was published in April 2012, a few months after Steve's death.

He has also published on more general topics. In his first published book, 10 Simple Secrets of the World's Greatest Business Communicators, he discussed the speaking techniques used by some well-known business leaders

His second book, In Fire Them Up!: 7 Simple Secrets to Inspire Colleagues, Customers, and Clients; Sell Yourself, Your Vision, and Your Values; Communicate with Charisma and Confidence, gives insights from men and women who ran several major companies.

In his third book, The Power of foursquare, he discusses social media and mobile marketing, for nearly fifty successful brands

Talk like TED is a self-help book written to help people develop better presentations by learning from research in effective communications, illustrated with descriptions of top TED talks.

== Bibliography ==
=== Books ===
- Gallo, Carmine (2005). Ten Simple Secrets of the World's Best Communicators (1st ed.). Naperville, Ill: Sourcebooks, Inc. p. 240. ISBN 978-1402206962.
- Gallo, Carmine (2007). Fire Them up: 7 Simple Secrets to Inspire Colleagues, Customers, and Clients; Sell Yourself, Your Vision, and Your Values; Communicate with Charisma and Confidence (1st ed.). Hoboken, N.N.: Wiley. pp. 229. ISBN 978-0470165669.
- Gallo, Carmine (2009). The Presentation Secrets of Steve Jobs (1st ed.). Hoboken, N.N.: McGraw-Hill. p. 256. ISBN 978-0071636087.
- Gallo, Carmine (2010). The Innovation Secrets of Steve Jobs: Insanely Different Principles for Breakthrough Success (1st ed.). Hoboken, N.J.: McGraw-Hill. p. 256. ISBN 978-0071748759.
- Gallo, Carmine (2011). The Power of foursquare: 7 Innovative Ways to Get Your Customers to Check In Wherever They Are (1st ed.). Hoboken, N.J.: McGraw-Hill. pp. 272. ISBN 978-0071773171.
- Gallo, Carmine (2012). The Apple Experience: Secrets to Building Insanely Great Customer Service (1st ed.). Hoboken, N.J.: McGraw-Hill. p. 256. ISBN 978-0071793209.
- Gallo, Carmine (2014). Talk Like TED: The 9 Public-Speaking Secrets of the World's Top Minds. New York, NY: St. Martin's Press. p. 288. ISBN 9781250041128. Archived from the original on January 10, 2014.
- Gallo, Carmine (2016). The Storyteller's Secret. New York, NY: St. Martin's Press. p. 268. ISBN 9781509814756.
- Gallo, Carmine (2018). Five Stars: The Communication Secrets to Get from Good to Great. New York, NY: St. Martin's Press. p. 256. ISBN 9781250155139
- Gallo, Carmine (2022). The Bezos Blueprint: Communication Secrets of the World's Greatest Salesman. New York, NY: St. Martin's Press. p. 272. ISBN 9781250278333
