= Janet Bodnar =

Editor of "Kiplinger's Personal Finance" magazine

Janet Bodnar is the editor of Kiplinger's Personal Finance magazine and a nationally recognized guru on personal and family finances. Prior to joining Kiplinger's, Bodnar worked for The Providence Journal and The Washington Post. She received an undergraduate degree from St. Bonaventure University and a master's degree in journalism from Columbia University, where she was also a Knight-Bagehot Fellow in Business and Economics Journalism.

She is married and has three children.

== Books ==
- "Money Smart Women: Everything You Need to Know to Achieve a Lifetime of Financial Security" (Kaplan)
- "Raising Money Smart Kids" (Kaplan)
- "Dollars & Sense for Kids" (Kiplinger's)
