= Michael Gurian =

American author and social philosopher

Michael Gurian is an American author and social philosopher. He works as a marriage and family counselor and corporate consultant. He has published twenty-eight books, several of which were New York Times bestseller list bestsellers. He is considered, along with Leonard Sax, as one of the major proponents of the post-modern "single-sex academic classes" movement.

His work tends to focus on sex differences and how they contribute to learning.

He is also a co-founder of the Gurian Institute, which trains professionals who deal with the developmental aspects of childhood. The Gurian Institute has trained more than 60,000 teachers from over 2,000 different schools. Some of these schools become "GI Model Schools" and aim to leverage the role gender plays in learning styles.

== Selected works ==
- (1996) The Wonder of Boys: What Parents, Mentors and Educators Can Do to Shape Boys into Exceptional Men Putnam, New York, ISBN 0-87477-831-X
- (1999) A Fine Young Man: What Parents, Mentors and Educators Can Do to Shape Adolescent Boys into Exceptional Men Putnam, New York, ISBN 0-87477-969-3
- with Patricia Henley and Terry Trueman (2001) Boys and Girls Learn Differently!: A Guide for Teachers and Parents Jossey-Bass, San Francisco, ISBN 0-7879-5343-1
- (2002) The Wonder of Girls: Understanding the Hidden Nature of Our Daughters Pocket Books, New York. ISBN 0-7434-1702-X
- (2003) What Could He Be Thinking?: How a Man's Mind Really Works St. Martin's Press, New York, ISBN 0-312-31148-6
- (2004) The Wonder of Children: Nurturing the Souls of Our Sons and Daughters Atria Books, New York. ISBN 0-7434-1705-4
- with Kathy Stevens (2005) The Minds of Boys: Saving Our Sons From Falling Behind in School and Life Jossey-Bass, San Francisco, ISBN 0-7879-7761-6
- with Barbara Annis (2008) Leadership and the Sexes: Using Gender Science to Create Success in Business Jossey-Bass, San Francisco, ISBN 0-7879-9703-X
