= Jefferson Fisher =

American lawyer and podcast host

- Born: November 9, 1988 (age 37)
- Education: McCombs School of Business (BBA, 2010); Texas Tech University School of Law (JD, 2014)
- Occupations: Lawyer; podcast host; author
- Spouse: Sierra Fisher
- Website: jeffersonfisher.com

Jefferson Fisher is an American lawyer, podcast host, and author. He is the host of The Jefferson Fisher Podcast. His first book, The Next Conversation: Argue Less, Talk More, released in March 2025, is a New York Times best seller.

== Early life and education ==
Fisher grew up in a family with a long legal tradition - his father was a fourth-generation lawyer. He attended the McCombs School of Business at the University of Texas. In 2014, he received a JD from Texas Tech University School of Law.

== Career ==
After law school, Fisher joined a law firm in Beaumont, Texas in a partner position. In late 2021, he left the firm to start his own in Southeast Texas. In early 2022, Fisher recorded videos sharing short, practical communication tips on social media to promote his newly founded law firm in Silsbee, Texas. He recorded them in his parked pickup truck. One particular video from a series he recorded titled "How to Argue Like a Lawyer" went viral on TikTok with more than one million views in one day after it was posted. By the end of 2022, Fisher had gained 500,000 followers on Instagram. By the summer of 2023, he had quadrupled his follower count on Instagram. By March 2025, he had 5.8 million Instagram followers and more than 500 million views on all of his videos. Partly due to the success of his videos, the law practice grew to 12 lawyers, including his wife and father.

In 2024, Fisher launched the Jefferson Fisher podcast with a season of 14 minutes episodes. On the podcast, Fisher provides short tips in an encouraging manner about topics related to self-improvement and communication, including how to speak with confidence, how to make small talk, and how to ask questions.

In March 2025, Fisher published his first book The Next Conversation: Argue Less, Talk More. The book is a guide on how to improve conversation by providing practical techniques and phrases that enhance interactions with others. The book spent five weeks on the New York Times Best Seller list, from April 6 to May 4, 2025.

== Personal life ==
Fisher and his wife Sierra have two children.
