= Henry S. Lodge =

American doctor and author

Henry Sears Lodge Jr. (October 20, 1958 – 2017), known as Harry, was an American internist and health writer.

== Early life and education ==
Lodge was born in Boston, Massachusetts, and raised in Beverly, Massachusetts. His father was a chairman of the Massachusetts Bay Transit Authority, and his grandfather was Senator Henry Cabot Lodge Jr., a Massachusetts senator and U.N. ambassador. His mother, Elenita Ziegler, was a freelance writer and civic activist.

Lodge attended Groton School and studied pre-medicine at the University of Pennsylvania, graduating in 1981. He earned his medical degree from the Columbia University College of Physicians and Surgeons in 1985.

== Career ==
After completing his residency at Columbia Presbyterian Medical Center, Lodge joined the staff at Presbyterian Hospital (now NewYork-Presbyterian Hospital) and held a professorship at Columbia University Medical Center.

In 1996, Lodge founded New York Physicians, a multi-specialty medical group affiliated with Columbia University and NewYork-Presbyterian Hospital. As chairman and chief executive, he expanded the group, establishing it as an important entry point for emerging medical professionals.

Lodge was also a successful author, known for his Younger Next Year series, which includes books such as Younger Next Year for Women and Younger Next Year: The Exercise Program. His works, which promote maintaining vitality in later life, have sold over two million copies and have been translated into 21 languages.

== Personal life ==
Lodge was married, but the marriage ended in divorce. He is survived by his mother, daughters Madeleine and Samantha, sister Felicity, brothers Fred and John, and his partner Ms. Yorke's sons, Elliott and Coleman Snyder.

Lodge died in 2017.
