= Paula Spencer (journalist) =

American journalist and author

Paula Patyk Spencer is an American journalist and author who specializes in parenting and family, pregnancy, women's health, and related social issues.

Spenser was a contributing editor to the former Parenting Magazine. She also contributes to Baby Talk Magazine, and Woman's Day. Spencer has written or co-authored a dozen books and more than 400 articles for national magazines. She has also made television, radio, and speaking appearances.

Paula Spencer has four children; Henry, Eleanor, Margaret, and Page.

== Biography ==
A native of Warren, Michigan, Spencer graduated from the University of Iowa, Iowa City, Iowa. Before becoming a full-time writer, Spencer was an editor in New York City and in Knoxville, Tennessee.

As an editorial director at Whittle Communications, a media company partially owned by Time Inc., she headed health, parenting, travel, and lifestyle publications. These included Travel Life, a bimonthly magazine for travel professionals (twice a finalist in the Magazine Week Publishing Excellence Awards).

Spencer is a senior editor at Caring.com, a website for adult children who are their parents' caregivers. Spencer also writes the blog Momfidence! on the Warner Brothers website Momlogic.com.

Spencer is a member of the Authors Guild (2004–present); the American Society of Journalists and Authors (1995–present); the American Pie Council (2004–present); and the American Society of Magazine Editors (1986–1999). She is a member of the Medical Journalism Advisory Board and a guest lecturer for the School of Journalism and Mass Communications at the University of North Carolina-Chapel Hill.

Spencer has appeared on The CBS Early Show and Oprah!.

Spencer has given talks on writing and parenting for the American Library Association, the American Society of Journalists and Authors, the North Carolina Writer's Network, the Wisconsin Early Childhood Association, the Women Today Expo, the Wisconsin Early Childhood Association annual meeting (Parent Night keynote), the Charlotte Parent Moms@Work and Carolina Parent Women@Work events (keynote), the Southern Women’s Show, the Mothers of Boys Clubs, the Women Today Expo, the Knoxville Writer’s Guild, and the North Carolina Writer’s Network Fall Conference.

== Awards and honors ==
Awards and honors include the American Speech Language Hearing Association 2006 Media Award; National Women's Political Caucus Emma Award for News Features, Large-Circulation Magazines; Western Publications Association “Maggie” for Consumer Magazine Article; and the Arthritis Foundation Russell Cecil Award for Magazine Writing.

== Bibliography ==
- Momfidence!: An Oreo Never Killed Anyone and Other Secrets of Happier Parenting (Crown, 2006).
- Parenting Guide to Positive Discipline
- Parenting Guide to Pregnancy & Childbirth
- Parenting Guide to Your Toddler
- Everything Else You Need to Know When You're Expecting: The New Etiquette for the New Mom
- Pregnancy Journal: A Week-By-Week Guide to a Happy, Health Pregnancy
- Parenting: The New Mom's Gift Kit

=== Collaborations ===
- Body, Soul, and Baby: A Doctor's Guide to the Complete Pregnancy Experience, from Preconception to Postpartum (with Dr. Tracy Gaudet)
- Consciously Female: How to Listen to Your Body and Your Soul for a Lifetime of Healthier Living (with Dr. Tracy Gaudet)
- The Happiest Toddler on the Block (with Harvey Karp)
- The V Book (with Dr. Elizabeth Stewart)
- Bright from the Start (with Jill Stamm)

=== Work in Anthologies ===
- The Experts' Guide to the Baby Years (Clarkson Potter, 2006)
- Guideposts for the Spirit: Stories for Sisters (Ideals, 2003)
