= Jeffrey Fox =

American businessperson

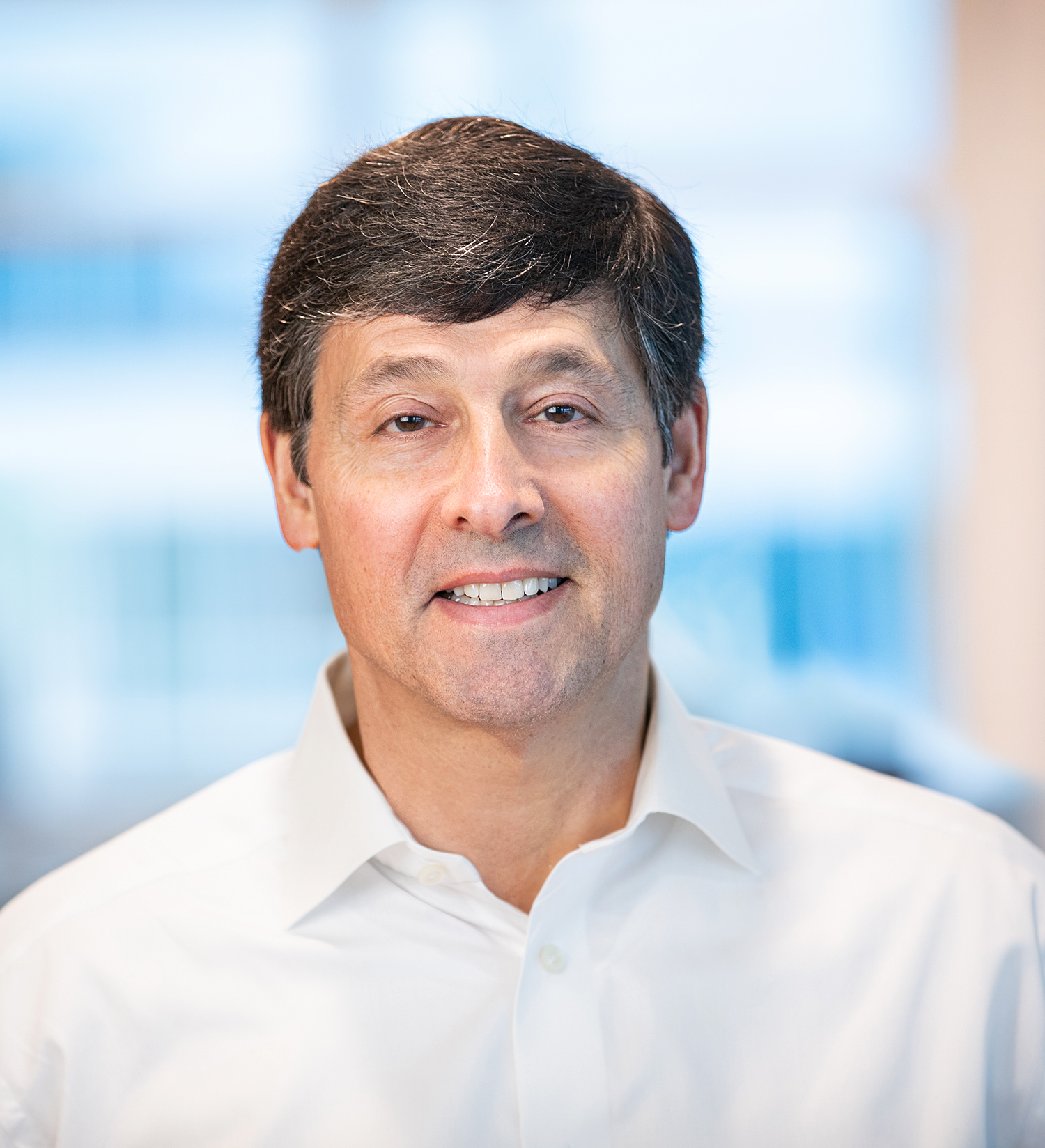
- Education: Duke University
- Known for: CEO of Endurance International Group

Jeff Fox is an American businessperson who is the CEO and founder of Circumference Group.

== Early life and career ==
Fox most recently was president and Chief Executive Officer of Endurance International Group Holdings, Inc., a provider of cloud-based platform solutions. As CEO, Jeff led the Endurance portfolio with approximately five million subscribers, ultimately overseeing the company's sale to Clearlake Capital Group in 2021.

Prior to joining Endurance, Fox was president and CEO of Convergys Corporation, a customer management company. He also was chairman of Convergys for more than five years, culminating in the company's acquisition by SYNNEX Corporation.

Before Convergys, Fox held multiple positions at Alltel Corporation. As Chief Operating Officer, Fox directed operations of the 5th largest wireless company in the US, and participated in the management team that led Alltel's $27 billion acquisition by TPG Capital and Goldman Sachs in 2007.

Fox began his career in investment banking for Merrill Lynch and Stephens Inc. He holds a B.A. in economics from Duke University.
