= List of coming-of-age stories =

Coming-of-age stories focus on the growth of a protagonist from childhood to adulthood, although "coming of age" is a genre for a variety of media, including literature, theatre, film, television and video games.

== In literature ==
- The Telemachy in Homer's Odyssey (8th century BC)
- Hayy ibn Yaqdhan, by Ibn Tufail (12th century)
- The History of Tom Jones, a Foundling, by Henry Fielding (1749)
- The Life and Opinions of Tristram Shandy, Gentleman, by Laurence Sterne (1759)
- Candide, by Voltaire (1759)
- Frankenstein, by Mary Shelley (1815)
- Northanger Abbey, by Jane Austen (1817)
- Oliver Twist, by Charles Dickens (1837–1839)
- Great Expectations, by Charles Dickens (1860–1861)
- Little Women, by Louisa May Alcott (1868–1869)
- Little Men, by Louisa May Alcott (1871)
- The Adventures of Tom Sawyer, by Mark Twain (1876)
- The Adventures of Huckleberry Finn, by Mark Twain (1884–1885)
- The Jungle Book by Rudyard Kipling (1894)
- The Red Badge of Courage, by Stephen Crane (1894–1895)
- The Blue Lagoon, by Henry De Vere Stacpoole (1908)
- Anne of Green Gables, by Lucy Maud Montgomery (1908)
- A Portrait of the Artist as a Young Man by James Joyce (1916)
- All Quiet on the Western Front, by Erich Maria Remarque (1929)
- Their Eyes Were Watching God, by Zora Neale Hurston (1937)
- Johnny Got His Gun, by Dalton Trumbo (1938)
- The Heart Is a Lonely Hunter, by Carson McCullers (1940)
- A Tree Grows in Brooklyn, by Betty Smith (1943)
- Johnny Tremain, by Esther Forbes (1943)
- The Catcher in the Rye, by J.D. Salinger (1951)
- East of Eden, by John Steinbeck (1952)
- Old Yeller, by Fred Gipson (1956)
- The Baron in the Trees, by Italo Calvino (1957)
- Flowers for Algernon, short story and novel by Daniel Keyes (short story 1959, novel 1966)
- To Kill a Mockingbird, novel by Harper Lee (1960)
- Where the Red Fern Grows, by Wilson Rawls (1961)
- A Clockwork Orange, a novel by Anthony Burgess (1962)
- The Learning Tree, novel by Gordon Parks (1963)
- The Graduate, novel by Charles Webb (1963)
- The Bell Jar, by Sylvia Plath (1964)
- Dune, by Frank Herbert (1965)
- The Last Picture Show, by Larry McMurtry (1966)
- The Outsiders, by S.E. Hinton (1967)
- Last Summer, by Evan Hunter (1968)
- A Kestrel for a Knave, by Barry Hines (1968)
- Sounder, by William H. Armstrong (1969)
- A Day No Pigs Would Die, by Robert Newton Peck (1972)
- A Hero Ain't Nothin' But a Sandwich, by Alice Childress (1973)
- Ordinary People, by Judith Guest (1976)
- A River Runs Through It, by Norman Maclean (1976)
- Vision Quest, by Terry Davis (1979)
- The Body, short story by Stephen King (1982)
- The Color Purple, by Alice Walker (1982)
- The Sheep-Pig, by Dick King-Smith (1983)
- Ender's Game, by Orson Scott Card (1985)
- It, by Stephen King (1986)
- This Boy's Life, memoirs by Tobias Wolff (1989)
- The Power of One, by Bryce Courtenay (1989)
- What's Eating Gilbert Grape, by Peter Hedges (1991)
- The Virgin Suicides, by Jeffrey Eugenides (1993)
- Ghost World, graphic novel by Daniel Clowes (1993–1997)
- The Dangerous Lives of Altar Boys, novel by Chris Fuhrman (1994)
- The Zigzag Kid, by David Grossman (1994)
- Into the Widening World, a collection of 26 short fictional coming-of-age stories by 26 notable authors (published 1995)
- Harry Potter, by J.K. Rowling (1997–2007)
- The Perks of Being a Wallflower, by Stephen Chbosky (1999)
- Alex Rider, by Anthony Horowitz (2000–till date)
- The Sisterhood of the Traveling Pants, by Ann Brashares (2001)
- Life of Pi, by Yann Martel (2001)
- Invincible, by Robert Kirkman (2003–2018)
- The Power of Five, by Anthony Horowitz (2005–2012)
- Winter's Bone, by Daniel Woodrell (2006)
- Call Me by Your Name, by André Aciman (2007)
- Someday This Pain Will Be Useful to You, by Peter Cameron (2007)
- The Enola Holmes Mysteries: The Case of the Missing Marquess, by Nancy Springer (2007)
- The Name of the Wind and the rest of The Kingkiller Chronicles by Patrick Rothfuss (2007–present)
- Skulduggery Pleasant and Valkyrie Cain by Derek Landy (2007–2014; 2017–present)
- Paper Towns, by John Green (2008)
- Homestuck, by Andrew Hussie (2009-04-13 to 2016-04-13)
- The Summer I Turned Pretty, by Jenny Han (2009–2011)
- The Miseducation of Cameron Post, by Emily M. Danforth (2012)
- Me and Earl and the Dying Girl, by Jesse Andrews (2012)
- Mushoku Tensei, by Rifujin na Magonote (2012–2015)
- I Want to Eat Your Pancreas, by Yoru Sumino (2014)
- Rascal Does Not Dream, by Hajime Kamoshida and Kēji Mizoguchi (2014–2025)
- Simon vs. the Homo Sapiens Agenda, by Becky Albertalli (2015)
- Bones & All, novel by Camille DeAngelis (2015)
- Violet Evergarden, by Kana Akatsuki (2015-2020)
- Classroom of the Elite, by Shōgo Kinugasa and Shunsaku Tosome (2015-present).
- Boy Erased: A Memoir, by Garrard Conley (2016)
- The Hate U Give, by Angie Thomas (2017)
- Boy Swallows Universe, by Trent Dalton (2018)
- Dear Evan Hansen: The Novel, by Val Emmich with Steven Levenson, Benj Pasek and Justin Paul (2018)
- The Prom: The Novel, by Saundra Mitchell with Matthew Sklar, Chad Beguelin and Bob Martin (2019)
- The Girl With The Black and Blue Doll, by Linda Summersea (2025)

== In theatre ==
- West Side Story (1957–present)
- Oliver! (1960–present)
- Miss Saigon (1989–present)
- Once on This Island (1990–present)
- Billy Elliot the Musical (2005–2016)
- Spring Awakening (2006–2015)
- Hadestown (2006–present)
- Heathers (musical) (2010–present)
- 4000 Miles (2011–2013, 2022)
- Choir Boy (2012–2019)
- Dear Evan Hansen (2015–present)
- Everybody's Talking About Jamie (2017–present)
- Mean Girls (2017–present)
- The Prom (2017–present)
- & Juliet (2019–present)
- Almost Famous (2019–present)
- The Outsiders (2022–present)
- How to Dance in Ohio (2022–2024)

== In manga and anime ==
A large portion of the manga industry is dedicated to teenagers, such as Weekly Shōnen Jump and Weekly Shōnen Magazine and, therefore, a majority of said manga contains some aspects of the protagonist's growth. Coming-of-age stories are called Shujinkō-Seichōkei (主人公成長系), meaning "protagonist's growth type".

=== Manga ===
- Dragon Ball (1984–1995)
- Saint Seiya (1985–1990)
- Sailor Moon (1992–1997)
- Initial D (1995–2013)
- Hunter × Hunter (1998–present)
- Beck (1999–2008)
- Naruto (1999–2014)
- Honey and Clover (2000–2006)
- Fullmetal Alchemist (2001–2010)
- Natsume's Book of Friends (2003–present)
- Vinland Saga (2005–2025)
- Solanin (2005–2006)
- Goodnight Punpun (2007–2013)
- Strobe Edge (2007–2010)
- March Comes In like a Lion (2007–present)
- School Babysitters (2009–present)
- The Flowers of Evil (2009–2014)
- Ao Haru Ride (2011–2015)
- Silver Spoon (2011–2019)
- Monthly Girls' Nozaki-kun (2011–present)
- My Love Story!! (2012-2016)
- Assassination Classroom (2012–2016)
- Haikyu!! (2012–2020)
- Orange (2012-2015)
- Mob Psycho 100 (2012–2017)
- A Silent Voice (2013–2014)
- My Hero Academia (2014–2024)
- Love Me, Love Me Not (2015–2019)
- O Maidens in Your Savage Season (2016–2019)
- Komi Can't Communicate (2016–2025)
- Witch Hat Atelier (2016–present)
- Blue Period (2017–present)
- My Dress-Up Darling (2018-2025)
- Shikimori's Not Just a Cutie (2019-2023)
- The Elusive Samurai (2021–2026)
- The Summer Hikaru Died (2021–2026)
- Akane-banashi (2022–present)
- Now That We Draw (2023–present)
- Centuria (2024–present)

=== Anime ===
- Neon Genesis Evangelion (1995–1996)
- The End of Evangelion (1997)
- Kiki's Delivery Service (1998)
- FLCL (2000–2001)
- Eureka Seven (2005)
- The Girl Who Leapt Through Time (2006)
- 5 Centimeters per Second (2007)
- Gurren Lagann (2007)
- Anohana (2011)
- From Up on Poppy Hill (2011)
- Code Geass: Akito the Exiled (2012-2016)
- Little Witch Academia (2013)
- Kill la Kill (2013–2014)
- Suzume (2022)
- Cyberpunk Edgerunners and his sequel (2022-2026)
- Trigun Stampede and his sequel Trigun Stargaze (2023-2026)

== In film ==
In film, coming-of-age is a genre of teen films. Films in this subgenre include:

- Little Women (1933)
- Anne of Green Gables (1934)
- Captains Courageous (1937)
- The Adventures of Tom Sawyer (1938)
- The Adventures of Huckleberry Finn (1939)
- The Wizard of Oz (1939)
- Babes in Arms (1939)
- Pinocchio (1940)
- Little Men (1940)
- Bambi (1942)
- The Human Comedy (1943)
- Meet Me in St. Louis (1944)
- A Tree Grows in Brooklyn (1945)
- Great Expectations (1946)
- Oliver Twist (1948)
- The Blue Lagoon (1949)
- Cattle Drive (1951)
- The Red Badge of Courage (1951)
- East of Eden (1955)
- Rebel Without a Cause (1955)
- The Apu Trilogy (1955–1959)
- Old Yeller (1957)
- Johnny Tremain (1957)
- The House of the Angel (1957)
- The 400 Blows (1959)
- West Side Story (1961)
- To Kill a Mockingbird (1962)
- David and Lisa (1962)
- The Graduate (1967)
- The Heart Is a Lonely Hunter (1968)
- Oliver! (1968)
- Romeo and Juliet (1968)
- Kes (1969)
- Last Summer (1969)
- The Learning Tree (1969)
- The Last Picture Show (1971)
- Summer of '42 (1971)
- Walkabout (1971)
- Sounder (1972)
- American Graffiti (1973)
- Badlands (1973)
- Tom Sawyer (1973)
- Huckleberry Finn (1974)
- Where the Red Fern Grows (1974)
- Cooley High (1975)
- Cornbread, Earl and Me (1975)
- the original Star Wars movie trilogy (1977–1983)
- Saturday Night Fever (1977)
- A Hero Ain't Nothin' But a Sandwich (1978)
- Big Wednesday (1978)
- Grease (1978)
- Bloodbrothers (1978)
- Breaking Away (1979)
- Over the Edge (1979)
- Fame (1980)
- Foxes (1980)
- Ordinary People (1980)
- The Blue Lagoon (1980)
- Endless Love (1981)
- Gregory's Girl (1981)
- The Fox and the Hound (1981)
- The Last American Virgin (1982)
- Fast Times at Ridgemont High (1982)
- Flashdance (1983)
- The Outsiders (1983)
- Risky Business (1983)
- Rumble Fish (1983)
- Footloose (1984)
- Sixteen Candles (1984)
- The Karate Kid (1984)
- The Bay Boy (1984)
- The Color Purple (1985)
- the Back to the Future movie trilogy (1985–1990)
- The Breakfast Club (1985)
- Fandango (1985)
- Heaven Help Us (1985) also known as Catholic Boys
- Mischief (1985)
- Vision Quest (1985)
- Come and See (1985)
- Pretty in Pink (1986)
- Stand by Me (1986)
- Some Kind of Wonderful (1987)
- Empire of the Sun (1987)
- Running on Empty (1988)
- Stand and Deliver (1988)
- Stealing Home (1988)
- Big (1988)
- Heathers (1988)
- Permanent Record (1988)
- Nuovo Cinema Paradiso (1988)
- The Delinquents (1989)
- Dead Poets Society (1989)
- Say Anything... (1989)
- The Little Mermaid (1989)
- A Brighter Summer Day (1989)
- Mermaids (1990)
- My Own Private Idaho (1991)
- Dogfight (1991)
- Boyz n the Hood (1991)
- The Man in the Moon (1991)
- Flirting (1991)
- A River Runs Through It (1992)
- A Bronx Tale (1993)
- Menace II Society (1993)
- Dazed and Confused (1993)
- This Boy's Life (1993)
- What's Eating Gilbert Grape (1993)
- The Man Without a Face (1993)
- The Thief and the Cobbler (1993)
- The Adventures of Huck Finn (1993)
- There Goes My Baby (1994)
- Little Women (1994)
- The War (1994)
- The Lion King (1994)
- Babe (1995)
- The Basketball Diaries (1995)
- Empire Records (1995)
- Kids (1995)
- Clueless (1995)
- Whisper of the Heart (1995)
- Tom and Huck (1995)
- The Boys Club (1996)
- Romeo + Juliet (1996)
- Titanic (1997)
- Telling Lies in America (1997)
- Radiofreccia (1998)
- All I Wanna Do (1998)
- 10 Things I Hate About You (1999)
- The Virgin Suicides (1999)
- The Wood (1999)
- The Iron Giant (1999)
- American Beauty (1999)
- Girl, Interrupted (1999)
- Almost Famous (2000)
- Billy Elliot (2000)
- Girlfight (2000)
- Bring It On (2000)
- How the Grinch Stole Christmas (2000)
- Y tu mamá también (2001)
- Spirited Away (2001)
- There's Only One Jimmy Grimble (2001)
- The Princess Diaries (2001)
- Dil Chahta Hai (2001)
- the Harry Potter film series (2001–2011)
- The Dangerous Lives of Altar Boys (2002)
- Bend It Like Beckham (2002)
- Better Luck Tomorrow (2002)
- Spirit: Stallion of the Cimarron (2002)
- Thirteen (2003)
- The Motorcycle Diaries (2003)
- Napoleon Dynamite (2004)
- House of D (2004)
- 13 Going on 30 (2004)
- Lakshya (2004)
- Mean Girls (2004)
- Temporada de patos (2004)
- The Sisterhood of the Traveling Pants (2005)
- Quinceañera (2006)
- ATL (2006)
- Ratatouille (2007)
- Superbad (2007)
- Happy Days (2007)
- Hounddog (2007)
- Persepolis (2007)
- Juno (2007)
- The Poker House (2008)
- 35 Shots of Rum (2008)
- Let the Right One In (2008)
- The Reader (2008)
- Gamyam (2008)
- Slumdog Millionaire (2008)
- Kotha Bangaru Lokam (2008)
- Fish Tank (2009)
- Bandslam (2009)
- Wake Up Sid (2009)
- the How to Train Your Dragon movie trilogy (2010–2019)
- Winter's Bone (2010)
- Submarine (2010)
- Let Me In (2010)
- Pariah (2011)
- Hick (2011)
- Turn Me On, Dammit! (2011)
- Life of Pi (2012)
- Moonrise Kingdom (2012)
- The Perks of Being a Wallflower (2012)
- The Zigzag Kid (2012)
- The Spectacular Now (2013)
- The Kings of Summer (2013)
- The Way Way Back (2013)
- Wetlands (2013)
- Fukrey (2013)
- Boyhood (2014)
- Girlhood (2014)
- The Fault in Our Stars (2014)
- The Falling (2014)
- Kingsman: The Secret Service (2014)
- Wolves (2014)
- Mustang (2015)
- Me and Earl and the Dying Girl (2015)
- The Diary of a Teenage Girl (2015)
- Dope (2015)
- Mistress America (2015)
- Paper Towns (2015)
- Coming Through the Rye (2015)
- Kerintha (2015)
- Sleeping Giant (2015)
- Yevade Subramanyam (2015)
- Inside Out (2015)
- The Peanuts Movie (2015)
- Moana (2016)
- Moonlight (2016)
- The Edge of Seventeen (2016)
- American Honey (2016)
- 20th Century Women (2016)
- 2 Cool 2 Be 4gotten (2016)
- Call Me by Your Name (2017)
- Hot Summer Nights (2017)
- Spider-Man: Homecoming (2017)
- Lady Bird (2017)
- It (2017)
- November Criminals (2017)
- Vunnadhi Okate Zindagi (2017)
- Coco (2017)
- Eighth Grade (2018)
- Mid90s (2018)
- The Hate U Give (2018)
- Leave No Trace (2018)
- Boy Erased (2018)
- The Miseducation of Cameron Post (2018)
- Love, Simon (2018)
- To All the Boys I've Loved Before (2018)
- Bumblebee (2018)
- The Grinch (2018)
- The King (2019)
- The Lion King (2019)
- Booksmart (2019)
- Little Women (2019)
- Yes, God, Yes (2019)
- Enola Holmes (2020)
- Cuties (2020)
- Onward (2020)
- Digimon Adventure: Last Evolution Kizuna (2020)
- Nahuel and the Magic Book (2020)
- The Half of It (2020)
- The Prom (2020)
- Cherry (2021)
- Chhello Show (2021)
- Luca (2021)
- Dear Evan Hansen (2021)
- Everybody's Talking About Jamie (2021)
- There's Someone Inside Your House (2021)
- Licorice Pizza (2021)
- CODA (2021)
- The Hand of God (2021)
- The Black Phone (2021)
- West Side Story (2021)
- Live Is Life (2021)
- Turning Red (2022)
- Aftersun (2022)
- Bones and All (2022)
- Sublime (2022)
- Egghead & Twinkie (2023)
- Are You There God? It's Me, Margaret. (2023)
- Barbie (2023)
- Freedom, Wisconsin (2023)
- The Holdovers (2023)
- Poor Things (2023)
- Riley (2023)
- Uproar (2023)
- The Boy and the Heron (2023)
- Inside Out 2 (2024)
- The Life of Chuck (2024)
- Transformers One (2024)
- Elio (2025)
- Frankenstein (2025)
- Michael (2026)
- Mouse (2026)
- Way of the Warrior Kid (2026)
- Rest and Relaxation (TBA)
- Merrily We Roll Along (TBA)

Films featuring protagonists in particular age groups, such as pre-teens, are:

- Melody (1971)
- Pretty Baby (1978)
- E.T. the Extra-Terrestrial (1982)
- My Girl (1991)
- The Sandlot (1993)
- Léon: The Professional (1994)
- Crooklyn (1994)
- Now and Then (1995)
- The White Balloon (1995)
- Matilda (1996)
- Ponette (1996)
- Pan's Labyrinth (2006)
- Beasts of the Southern Wild (2012)
- Mud (2012)
- The Florida Project (2017)
- Jojo Rabbit (2019)
- C'mon C'mon (2021)
- Armageddon Time (2022)
- The Fabelmans (2022)
- 28 Years Later (2025)

or post-high school and college students, in films such as:

- Love Story (1970)
- Young People (1972)
- Carrie (1976)
- Animal House (1978)
- Porky's (1981)
- With Honors (1994)
- Kicking and Screaming (1995)
- Good Will Hunting (1997)
- Can't Hardly Wait (1998)
- American Pie (1999)
- Ghost World (2001)
- Legally Blonde (2001)
- the Spider-Man film franchise (2002–present)
- An Education (2009)
- 3 Idiots (2009)
- Monsters University (2013)
- Whiplash (2014)
- Everybody Wants Some!! (2016)
- Aanandam (2016)
- Meesaya Murukku (2017)
- Chhichhore (2018)
- The Souvenir (2019)
- Klaus (film) (2019)
- Pink Skies Ahead (2020)
- The Mitchells vs. the Machines (2021)
- Don (2022)

or people aged around 20 years old who do not go to college, such as:

- Brooklyn (2015)
- Sweet 20 (2017)

or in the case of unique coming-of-age stories centered on post-college aged individuals, such as:

- All Quiet on the Western Front (1930)
- It's a Wonderful Life (1946)
- The Seven Year Itch (1955)
- The Graduate (1967)
- Charly (1968)
- Johnny Got His Gun (1971)
- Taxi Driver (1976)
- An Officer and a Gentleman (1982)
- St. Elmo's Fire (1985)
- What's Eating Gilbert Grape (1993)
- Forrest Gump (1994)
- Never Been Kissed (1999)
- Old School (2003)
- The 40-Year-Old Virgin (2005)
- Frances Ha (2012)
- Wild (2014)
- The Worst Person in the World (2021)
- All Quiet on the Western Front (2022)
- The End We Start From (2023)
- The Holdovers (2023)
- Almost Popular (2024)

== In television ==
Coming-of-age television series include:

- 13 Reasons Why (2017–2020)
- Accidentally Famous (2024–2026)
- Adventure Time (2010–2018)
- Agatha All Along (2024)
- Amphibia (2019–2022)
- Anne with an E (2017–2019)
- Annika (1984)
- Anohana: The Flower We Saw That Day (2011)
- Atypical (2017–2021)
- Avatar: The Last Airbender (2005–2008)
- Avatar: Seven Havens (2026–present)
- Boy Meets World (1993–2000)
- Buffy the Vampire Slayer (1997–2003)
- Cobra Kai (2018-2025)
- Dawson's Creek (1998–2003)
- Degrassi franchise (1979–2017)
  - Degrassi: The Next Generation (2001–2015)
- Di4ries (2022–present)
- The End of the F***ing World (2017–2019)
- Euphoria (2019–2026)
- Everything Sucks! (2018)
- Freaks and Geeks (1999–2000)
- Friday Night Lights (2006–2011)
- Gilmore Girls (2000-2007)
- Girl Meets World (2014–2017)
- Girlboss (2017)
- Glee (2009–2015)
- Gossip Girl (2007–2012)
- Grand Army (2020–present)
- Gravity Falls (2012–2016)
- Happy Days (1974–1984)
- Harvey Beaks (2015–2017)
- Heartstopper (2022–present)
- Hilda (2018–2023)
- I Am Not Okay with This (2020)
- Invincible (2021–present)
- Ironheart (2025)
- Ladhood (2019–present)
- The Legend of Korra (2012–2014)
- Little House on the Prairie (1974–1983)
- Love, Victor (2020–2022)
- The Lying Life of Adults (2023)
- Malhação (1995–present)
- Ms. Marvel (2022)
- My Brilliant Friend (2018–2024)
- My Mad Fat Diary (2013-2015)
- My So-Called Life (1994–1995)
- The O.C. (2003–2007)
- On My Block (2018–2021)
- One Day at a Time (2017–2020)
- One Summer (1983)
- One Tree Hill (2003-2012)
- Over the Garden Wall (2014)
- The Owl House (2020-2023)
- PEN15 (2019–2021)
- Prisma (2022–present)
- The Queen's Gambit (2020)
- The Sea Beyond (2020–present)
- A Series of Unfortunate Events (2017–2019)
- Sex Education (2019–present)
- Sintonia (2019–present)
- Skam (2015–2017)
  - SKAM Austin (2018–2019)
- Skins (2007–2013)
- South Park (1997-present)
- Steven Universe (2013–2019)
  - Steven Universe Future (2019-2020)
- Star Wars: Skeleton Crew (2024–present)
- Stranger Things (2016–2025)
- The Summer I Turned Pretty (2022–present)
- Teen Wolf (2011–2017)
- That 70's Show (1998–2006)
- Twenty-Five Twenty-One (2022)
- Veronica Mars (2004-2007; 2019)
- We Are Who We Are (2020)
- We Bare Bears (2015–2020)
- Wednesday (2022–present)
- The Wonder Years (1988–1993)
  - The Wonder Years (2021) (2021–2023)
- Anos Rebeldes (1992)
- Young Royals (2021–present)
- Young Sheldon (2017–2024)

== In video games ==
- A Plague Tale: Innocence (2019)
- Beyond: Two Souls (2013)
- Brothers: A Tale of Two Sons (2013)
- Celeste (2018)
- Child of Light (2014)
- Devil May Cry 4 (2008)
  - Devil May Cry 5 (2019)
- Dragon Quest V (1992)
- Dragon Quest XI (2017)
- EarthBound (1994)
- Firewatch (2016)
- God of War (2018)
  - God of War Ragnarök (2022)
- Horizon Zero Dawn (2017)
- Kingdom Hearts (2002)
- The Last of Us (2013)
- The Legend of Zelda: Ocarina of Time (1998)
- The Legend of Zelda: The Wind Waker (2002)
- Life Is Strange (2015)
- Lil Gator Game (2022)
- Marvel's Spider-Man: Miles Morales (2020)
- Never Alone (2014)
- Night in the Woods (2017)
- Ori and the Blind Forest (2015)
  - Ori and the Will of the Wisps (2020)
- Oxenfree (2015)
- Perfect Tides (2022)
- Persona (1996–present)
- Pokémon Red and Blue (1996)
- A Short Hike (2019)
- Tell Me Why (2020)
- Toem (2021)
- Umamusume: Pretty Derby (2021)
- Uncharted 4: A Thief's End (2016)
- Undertale (2015)
- Until Then (2024)
- The Walking Dead (2012–2019)
- What Remains of Edith Finch (2017)
- The World Ends with You (2007)
- Xenoblade Chronicles 2 (2017)
- Xenoblade Chronicles 3 (2022)
