= Family estrangement =

Loss of relationship between family members

Family estrangement is the cessation or reduction of a previously existing relationship between family members, often to the extent that there is little to no communication for a prolonged period. Often, at least one of the parties wants estrangement to end.

Family estrangements are broken relationships between parents, grandparents, siblings, children, cousins, etc. Characteristics of estrangement may include a lack of empathy in one or more of the parties involved. This can result in heightened levels of stress in all parties, although in the case of an abusive relationship the victim may feel a sense of relief once the source of stress has been removed.

A significant proportion of estrangements involve a third party, such as a member of the extended family or the adult child's spouse. For example, a child who dislikes a stepparent might refuse to have a relationship with the parent who married the stepparent; in such a case, the stepparent is the third party involved in the estrangement between the child and the parent. In some cases, the third party provides emotional support to the individual initiating the estrangement, providing the estranger with an alternative social support system and thus enabling the deepening of the estrangement. In other instances, the third party—whether deliberately or not—is actually the sole or primary cause of two family members becoming estranged. Surveys that ask adult children directly, however, find that they most often attribute estrangement to the parent's own conduct—such as emotional abuse, neglect, or feeling unaccepted—rather than to a third party, and that estranged parents and their adult children tend to give systematically different accounts of why the relationship broke down.

In situations where the estrangement is unilateral, the rejected individual may or may not try a number of strategies to repair the rift. In some cases, taking responsibility and making amends for harsh words or difficult circumstances may improve the relationship.

In some cases, the initiator of the estrangement stipulates rules or boundaries in order to maintain limited contact with the person they have estranged. In other cases, the initiator is unable or unwilling to consider any type of reconciliation.

== Health implications ==
Although the rejected party's psychological and physical health may decline, the estrangement initiator's may improve due to the cessation of abuse, if present, and conflict. The social rejection in family estrangement is the equivalent of ostracism which undermines four fundamental human needs: the need to belong, the need for control in social situations, the need to maintain high levels of self-esteem, and the need to have a sense of meaningful existence. The rejected parties suffer adverse psychological consequences such as loneliness, low self-esteem, aggression, and depression.

Family estrangement activates the grief response because people who have experienced it often see it as a loss they were not prepared for and happened unexpectedly. However, the rejected family member may not achieve the final grief stage of acceptance, given that the social death of the relationship is potentially reversible. The prolonged suffering of the rejected party, together with a perceived or real stigma of having been rejected by a family member, results in isolation and behavioral changes in the rejected party.

Social workers who work with the elderly population are at the forefront of a new fallout from family estrangement. Non-supportive or absent family members during someone's end-of-life acutely increase the pain and stress of the final days.

== Demographics ==
A study of adults estranged from their parents in the United States published in 2023 found that adults were more likely to be estranged from their father than from their mother and that LGBT individuals were significantly more likely than straight adults to estrange from their father while sexual orientation made no difference in the likelihood of estrangement from an individual's mother. Black adults were one-quarter less likely to estrange from their mothers than white adults but three times likelier to estrange from their fathers. On average, people who estranged from parents did so in their mid-twenties. Many estrangements eventually reconciled.

An October 2022 YouGov poll in the United States found that 29% of Americans were estranged from a parent (11%), child (9%), sibling (14%), or grandparent (5%). Considerably higher numbers of gay men (49%), lesbian women (55%), and bisexual people (38%) were estranged from a family member compared to heterosexual people (27%).

One study found that more than half of estrangements were either temporarily or permanently resolved within a ten-year timespan.

=== Culture ===
Cultural attitudes influence the frequency of estrangement, with the United States experiencing about twice as many parent-child estrangements compared to Israel, Germany, England and Spain.

The emphasis on the individual over a collective family unit is regarded as contributing to estrangement, as well as a rationale for estrangement. In individualistic cultures, the estranger may attribute the causes of estrangement to emotional, physical or sexual abuse. Some have pointed to recent political and cultural changes, for example an "enormous expansion in behaviors described as harmful, traumatizing or abusive" that occurred within a very short time frame, i.e., within a single generation. Other estrangers may see a lack of emotional support or clash of values as the justification, or may blame the other person for their own unhappiness.

Estrangement is an isolating experience in ways that extend past the severed familial bond. Social science studies have found that neither estranged parents nor their adult offspring often discuss their estrangement socially, due to social stigma and frequent backlash.

For some victims of psychological or emotional abuse, the damage has been done over a long period of time by a characteristic pattern of subtle and deniable abuse. For these people, validation may never appear in any meaningful form unless it is professional help. The estranged may also become less socially accepted because of lowered self-regulation, a reaction to the social rejection.

== Contributing causes ==
Estrangement may result from the involvement or interference of a third party.

=== Value or identity conflict ===
A family member's sexual orientation, choice of spouse, gender identity, politics, disability, religion or lack thereof may cause the estranged party to feel judged, unloved, or unaccepted causing them to initiate the estrangement or may cause the parents to disown their child. Life choices regarding education, profession, and geography are other potentially emotionally charged topics that reflect social values.

=== Divorce ===
Divorce was cited as a reason for estrangement by 12.3% of parents and 2.3% of children in one study. Divorced families are significantly over-represented among people experiencing a parent–child estrangement.

=== Child abuse ===
Child abuse in the form of emotional, psychological, sexual, or physical abuse was cited by 13.9% of children who initiated estrangement with one or both parents as a reason for estrangement. Furthermore, 2.9% of estranged parents acknowledged their failure to prevent the abuse. Abuse by siblings is a factor in some estrangements between siblings.

Changes over the decades in what is perceived to be appropriate parenting styles can also cause estrangements between adults. For example, if a single parent has to work two jobs, the child may later decide that this was neglectful behavior, even if the parent is working long hours out of necessity and even if the parent's work-related absence was socially acceptable at the time.

=== Substance abuse ===
Substance and alcohol abuse, on the part of either the estranger or the estranged, are common causes of family tension and the resulting separation. The most highly predictive domain of social estrangement for both alcohol and drug dependency is homelessness.

=== Mental illness ===
Mental illness on the part of either the estranger or the estranged is also a common cause of family tension and estrangement.

Post traumatic stress disorder (PTSD) is correlated with family estrangement. Both the PTSD sufferer's symptoms and the family members' failure to be sufficiently supportive can contribute to the estrangement. Studies on soldiers with PTSD have concluded that families with a PTSD patient require more support to facilitate healing and prevent estrangement.

=== Betrayal of trust ===
From disputes over inheritances to perceived insults in public settings, a sense of betrayal can weaken the trust bonds of a family.

== Explanations ==
Competing hypotheses attempt to understand and explain estrangement.

=== Bowen theory ===
The separation of young adults from their families of origin in order to create families of their own is part of normal human development. According to Murray Bowen, this separation can be achieved in a healthy and gradual manner that preserves the intergenerational relationships of the family of origin, providing both the new family and family of origin with a sense of continuity and support. Alternatively, a schism can differentiate these life stages. Familial estrangement falls into the second category.

In Bowen's theory, emotional cutoff and avoidance are unhealthy coping mechanisms for dealing with anxiety and stress. These coping mechanisms represent emotional and intellectual systems that are fused rather than differentiated, so that emotions overwhelm objective thought process and govern behavior. Poor differentiation is associated with continued relationship problems in life. Poor differentiation is also contagious in that it may induce stress in others. High differentiation is associated with emotional interdependence and multi-generational cooperation. Triangulation is when a third party enters the dynamic. A third party, however, may increase tension and trigger a rebellion.

In the Bowen theory, both the estranger and the estranged may use social and work relationships to create substitute families. Support groups and other highly emotional organizations also provide a conduit for emotional energy from unresolved issues with parents, siblings and other family members.

=== Personal growth ===
Only since the late 20th century, family estrangement has been framed, usually by the estrangers rather than the involuntarily estranged family members, as a sign of their own personal growth. This marks a recent shift from families as a source of moral obligations and material support to people seeing their families as tools to increase their individual happiness and to affirm their identities. People in this mindset may say that their choice is courageous rather than avoidant or selfish. Other analyses locate the rise in estrangement in structural change rather than in individual values; Reczek and colleagues observe that intergenerational ties have historically been sustained partly by economic interdependence, and point to structural forces that may unequally shape who becomes estranged.

Other researchers frame the same phenomenon as a self-protective response to a harmful relationship rather than as a symptom of expanding definitions of harm, noting that in survey research a majority of estranged adults report improvements in their wellbeing following estrangement.

== Perspectives of adult children who initiate estrangement ==
Much of the earlier clinical literature on estrangement was written from the standpoint of the rejected parent. A growing body of empirical research instead examines estrangement from the perspective of the adult children who initiate it, and generally finds that they describe it as a gradual, considered response to a parent's behaviour rather than an impulsive act.

In a 2015 survey of 807 estranged adults conducted by the University of Cambridge Centre for Family Research and the charity Stand Alone, the factor most commonly rated "very relevant" to estrangement from both mothers and fathers was emotional abuse—cited by 77% of those estranged from a mother and 59% of those estranged from a father—followed by mismatched expectations about family roles, a clash of personality or values, and neglect. Respondents estranged from a parent were more likely to report having initiated the estrangement themselves than to report that the parent had, and most strongly agreed that they could never again have a functional relationship with that parent. Eighty per cent of respondents said the estrangement had had positive effects on their lives, most often greater feelings of freedom, independence and being at peace. The survey used a self-selected sample recruited through a support organisation, and respondents were predominantly women.

The communication scholar Kristina Scharp conceptualises estrangement not as a single event but as an ongoing process of "distancing", in which a family member reduces contact and interdependence in response to a persistently negative relationship. In interview studies, adult children commonly attribute the decision to abuse, neglect, betrayal, feeling unsupported, or a parent's substance misuse, and describe reaching estrangement only after repeated unsuccessful attempts to repair the relationship. From the initiator's standpoint, continued distance is frequently experienced as self-protective rather than as a loss.

In the first large-scale national survey of estrangement in the United States, reported in his 2020 book Fault Lines, the sociologist Karl Pillemer found that 27% of American adults were estranged from a family member, and that estrangement was typically initiated by one person after a prolonged period rather than suddenly.

== Costs and benefits ==
In the case of a parent–child estrangement, in which the adult child is typically the estranger, the adult child may receive benefits such as a sense of gaining power within the relationship, of freedom, or of control. The rejected parents do not experience any benefits but do experience social stigma and feelings of loss.

== Reconciliation ==
Reconciliation and resolution of the conflict are possible in some situations. Reconciliation is not sought by everyone who is estranged. Research on adult children who have initiated estrangement finds that many do not wish to resume contact and may experience pressure to reconcile as unwelcome, particularly where the original harm has not been acknowledged. A decision to "live life forward", and to not seek the emotional validation of getting the other parties to agree about what happened in the past, helps some people build a functional, if sometimes more limited, relationship. This may involve setting boundaries collaboratively, for example, so that all parties agree that a particularly difficult subject will not be discussed. For example, parents and their adult children may set boundaries together about how often they want to communicate or what information should be considered private.

Triggers for reconciliation include changes in the family situation due to death or divorce, worries about health and death, and developing a clearer perspective about the original situation through the passage of time.

== See also ==
- Absenteeism
- Attachment theory
- Conflict avoidance
- Disownment
- Emotional detachment
- Ghosting
- Karpman drama triangle
- Parental alienation
- Psychological punishment
- Shunning
- Sibling estrangement
- Sibling rivalry
- Silent treatment
- Social rejection
- Defence mechanisms
