= Sibling deidentification =

Sibling deidentification is a cognitive identity-formation process that increases the extent to which one sibling (or both) in a sibling dyad defines his or her identity in terms of difference from other sibling. Although extremely common, not all siblings deidentify. Deidentification, as a process of difference, is in direct competition with processes that cause similarity in siblings, such as modeling and a shared environment. In most sibling relationships, all of these effects will exert influence on identity formation, some causing identification (siblings judge themselves as similar) and some causing deidentification (siblings judge themselves to be different).

== Conceptual foundations ==
=== Scientific psychology ===
Although, the term deidentification itself was coined in 1976, theorizing about the effects of sibling relationships on adolescent identity formation, and thus later life outcomes, began more than a century earlier. Sir Francis Galton's study of birth order effects tracks directly to early deidentification studies, in which the causal variable was a subtle variation on birth order called "birth-order pair". In 1874, Sir Francis Galton wrote a book called English Men of Science: Their Nature and Nurture, reporting his research finding that among England's leading scientists, many more were firstborn sons than would be expected by chance (twice as many). Much of Galton's finding wasn't due to sibling psychology because, as he explained, primogeniture laws gave firstborns an immeasurable advantage. However, Galton offered another causal explanation; that firstborns receive more parental attention, which is a direct precedent for some of the psychological causes of deidentification discussed below. Galton's psychological explanation is a more important precedent for deidentification than birth order, because the most recent research and theory on deidentification aren't concerned with birth order.

== Psychoanalysis ==
Although social science is the current research domain for deidentification, as well as the earliest intellectual foundation, the early deidentification studies in 1976 &1977 track most directly back to the psychoanalytical theories of the mid-20th century, . Specifically, the work of Alfred Adler, in which birth order, again, was central to psychological development and outcomes across the lifespan. Adler, much more so that Galton, was much ore focused on sibling psychological processes, than on using birth order as a predictor (not that predictive modeling was in his wheelhouse. As a psychoanalyst, Adler didn't conduct scientific research). Adler agreed with Galton, that a firstborn would benefit from undivided parental attention. but not about the psychological processes that would result. Adler argued that as later siblings were born, the firstborn would suffer a psychological process he called dethronement, causing later negative life outcomes, e.g., substance abuse or criminal insanity. Although this theory wasn’t supported by later scientific research, Adler left an important mark on sibling research for two reasons. First his work demonstrates the importance of theorizing underlying psychological processes over simple structural predictors like birth order. Second, he understood and made clear the one central question that he, Galton, and deidentification researchers all ask, "why are siblings so different from one another?"

== Causes ==
Adolescent siblings may begin to deidentify for a number of reasons.

- Sibling conflict: Siblings deidentification can occurs as a result of conflict within the sibling relationship, which is common. For example, 62% of high school seniors report having physically struck their sibling in the past year.
- Sibling rivalry/niche-filling: Siblings may use deidentification to reduce competition for finite parental resources (sibling rivalry). Thus, deidentification process reduces sibling rivalry. Deidentification (and the corresponding niche filling) allows them to branch off to form their own, different identity and to become familiarized with their individual personality.
- Social comparisons: Some findings suggest that deidentification is a process by which siblings can protect themselves from social comparison. It is more common in siblings who share common characteristics, such as age and sex.
- Split-parent identification: In analyzing the family as a system, rather than a single sibling dyadic relationship alone, more complex relationships give rise to more complex effects. Counter-intuitively, one of the similarity processes discussed above, modeling, can actually cause sibling deidentification in certain family structures. For example, When two parents are very different from each other, two siblings may each model a different parent (which is a split-parent identification). Modeling the differences, in turn, causes deidentification between the siblings.
