= Sibling rivalry =

Type of competition or animosity

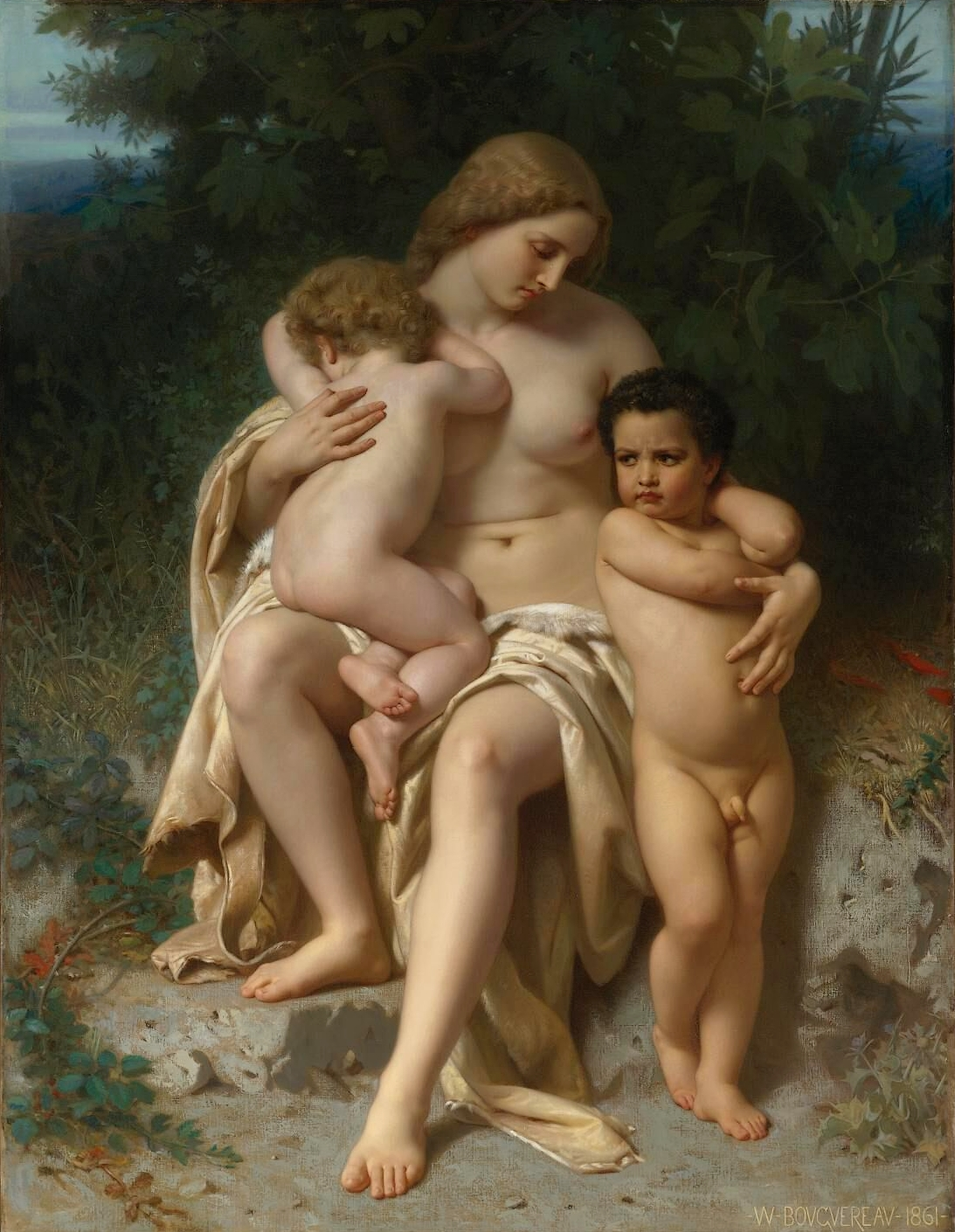
The First Quarrel (1861) by William-Adolphe Bouguereau

Sibling rivalry is a type of competition or animosity among siblings, whether blood-related or not.

In childhood, siblings generally spend more time together than they do with parents. Sibling bonds are influenced by factors such as parental treatment, birth order, personality, people and experiences outside the family. Sibling rivalry is more prominent when children are close in age and of the same gender and/or where one or multiple children are intellectually gifted.

== Throughout the lifespan ==
According to observational studies by Judith Dunn, children are sensitive to differences in parental treatment from one year of age. From 18 months, siblings can understand family rules and know how to comfort and be kind to each other. By the age of 3, children have a sophisticated grasp of social rules, can evaluate themselves in relation to their siblings, and know how to adapt to circumstances within the family.

Sibling rivalry often continues throughout childhood and can be frustrating and stressful for parents and children alike. Adolescents fight for the same reasons younger children fight, but they are better equipped to physically, intellectually, and emotionally hurt and be intellectually and emotionally hurt by each other. Physical and emotional changes cause pressures in the teenage years, as do changing relationships with parents and friends. Fighting with siblings as a way to get parental attention may increase in adolescence. One study found that the highest level of competition between siblings occurs between the ages of 10 and 15.

Sibling rivalry can continue into adulthood, and sibling relationships can change dramatically over the years. Events, such as a parent's illness, may bring siblings closer together, whereas divorce may drive them apart, particularly if the in-law relationship is strained. Approximately one-third of adults describe their relationship with siblings as rivalrous or distant. However, rivalry often lessens over time. At least 80 percent of siblings over the age of 60 enjoy close ties.

== Causes ==
According to Kyla Boyse from the University of Michigan, each child in a family competes to define who they are as an individual and wants to show that they are separate from their siblings. Children may feel they are getting unequal amounts of their parents' attention, discipline, and responsiveness. Children fight most in families where there is neither any understanding that fighting is not an acceptable way to resolve conflicts nor any alternative way of handling such conflicts; in families in which physical fighting is forbidden but no method of non-physical conflict resolution (e.g., verbal argument) is permitted, the conversion and accumulation of everyday disputes into long-simmering hostilities can have an effect nearly as corrosive. Stress in the parents' and children's lives can create conflicts increasing sibling rivalry.

=== Other psychological approaches ===
Alfred Adler saw siblings as "striving for significance" within the family and felt that birth order was an important aspect of personality development. In fact, psychologists and researchers today endorse the influence of birth order, as well as age and gender constellations, on sibling relationships. However, parents are seen as capable of having an important influence on whether they are competitive or not.

David Levy introduced the term "sibling rivalry" in 1941, claiming that for an older sibling "the aggressive response to the new baby is so typical that it is safe to say it is a common feature of family life." Researchers generally endorse this view, noting that parents can ameliorate this response by taking appropriate preventative steps and avoiding favoritism. The ideal time to lay the groundwork for a lifetime of supportive relationships between siblings is during the months prior to the new baby's arrival.

=== Parenting style ===
Parents influence sibling relationships. The sibling connection can then incorporate many facets of the parent-child relationship. The parenting style children experience impacts how siblings develop differently in terms of their skills and interests. According to Jensen and McHale (2015). "although they are 50% genetically similar, on average, and usually grow up in the same home, full biological siblings are typically no more similar to one another than they are to strangers". The child's self-image within the larger family dynamic is impacted by these variances. Early categorization by parents impacts how the child perceives their place in the family. According to research on sibling differentiation and Adler's theory of individual psychology, siblings differ from one another in order to fill voids within the family and lessen conflict and rivalry for family resources. This mechanism is supposed to cause siblings to diverge from one another over time. According to research, children frequently live up to their parents' expectations when they have higher expectations for their prospective accomplishments. This may lead to differences in how siblings are treated by their parents. It has been demonstrated that many parents have higher expectations for their daughters than for their sons. In many families, the oldest kid is also held to the highest standards. This disparity in viewpoints of a child's potential for success can lead to partiality, neglect, and isolation—both physically and emotionally. Children are influenced by what they witness their parents doing in regards to their siblings. Children who experience abuse and harsh parenting early in life or who see violent parent-child interactions are more likely to respond aggressively toward their siblings. According to coercion theory, inadequate parenting (such as using harsh punishments like spanking or scolding) and failing to discipline a child results in hostile, coercive sibling interactions. According to Dantchev and Wolke "when parents are unable to intervene effectively (by ignoring or allowing negative behavior within the family system), the sibling relationship may become a training ground through which hostility is reinforced and eventually escalates into sibling bullying (victimization or perpetration)." Children's conduct with other people are influenced by how their parents engage with them. Greater childhood aggression has frequently been linked to parent-child antagonism and inadequate child monitoring. More warmth and less animosity between parents and children are mirrored in the sibling relationship, which is another parenting behavior that is related to the quality of the sibling connection. The way parents communicate with one another serves as a significant role model for how their children will interact with others. According to Corinna Tucker, "exposure to interparental conflict and family violence and parenting qualities are linked to children's sibling victimization and that severe physical sibling victimization has the most connections to these negative family experiences". When compared to other stages of life, childhood is when family contact patterns have the most impact on how children learn to connect with others. One of the most enduring types of partnerships, sibling ties can help youngsters develop cognitive and socioemotional skills. A child's future relationships with others as well as their relationship with their siblings can both be negatively impacted by a parent's parenting style. In her work on sibling dynamics, Riri Trivedi suggests that parenting styles should shift from active intervention in conflicts to a "facilitative" role, where parents guide children to negotiate their own resolutions to build long-term emotional intelligence and conflict-resolution skills.

== Prevention ==
Parents can reduce the opportunity for rivalry by refusing to compare or typecast their children, planning fun family activities together, and making sure each child has enough time and space of their own. They can also give each child individual attention, encourage teamwork, refuse to hold up one child (such as the oldest) as a role model for the others (such as the younger children), and avoid favoritism. Teaching the children positive ways to ask for attention from parents when they need it can also make it less likely that they will resort to aggressive attention-getting strategies. Eileen Kennedy-Moore notes that this remedy also requires that parents "catch children being good" by responding to children's kind, helpful, and creative bids for attention. Additionally, by being proactive about teaching children emotional intelligence, problem solving skills, negotiation skills, and encouraging them to look for win-win solutions, parents can help children resolve conflicts that arise as a normal part of growing up together in the same household. A concerted effort by parents to reduce competitiveness while nurturing bonding can further help alleviate sibling rivalry.

However, according to Sylvia Rimm, although sibling rivalry can be reduced, it is unlikely to be entirely eliminated. In moderate doses, rivalry may be a healthy indication that each child is assertive enough to express his or her differences with other siblings.

Vernon Weihe suggests that four criteria should be used to determine if questioned and/or questionable behavior is rivalry or sibling abuse. First, given that children use different conflict-resolution tactics during various developmental stages, one must rule out the possibility that the questioned behavior is in fact age-appropriate for the child exhibiting it. Second, one must determine whether the behavior is an isolated incident or instead part of an enduring pattern: abuse is, by definition, a long-term pattern rather than occasional disagreements. Third, one must determine if there is an "aspect of victimization" to the behavior: rivalry tends to be incident-specific, reciprocal, and obvious to others, while abuse is characterized by secrecy and an imbalance of power. Fourth, one must determine the goal of the questioned and/or questionable behavior: while rivalry is motivated entirely or primarily by aspects of a child's self-interest in which the interests of others, including the child's rival, do not play a role, in scenarios featuring abuse, the perpetrator's ultimate interests tend to include domination, humiliation, or at least embarrassment of the victim.

== Animals ==
Sibling rivalry is common among various animal species, in the form of competition for food and parental attention. An extreme type of sibling rivalry occurs when young animals kill their siblings. For example, a black eagle mother lays two eggs, and the first-hatched chick pecks the younger one to death within the first few days. In the blue-footed booby, there is always the emergence of a brood hierarchy. The dominant chick will attack the subordinate one in times of food scarcity, often pecking it repeatedly or driving it from the nest. Among spotted hyenas, sibling competition begins as soon as the second cub is born, and 25% of cubs are killed by their siblings.

Sibling relationships in animals are not always competitive. For example, among wolves, older siblings help to feed and guard the young.

== Famous instances ==
=== In religion ===
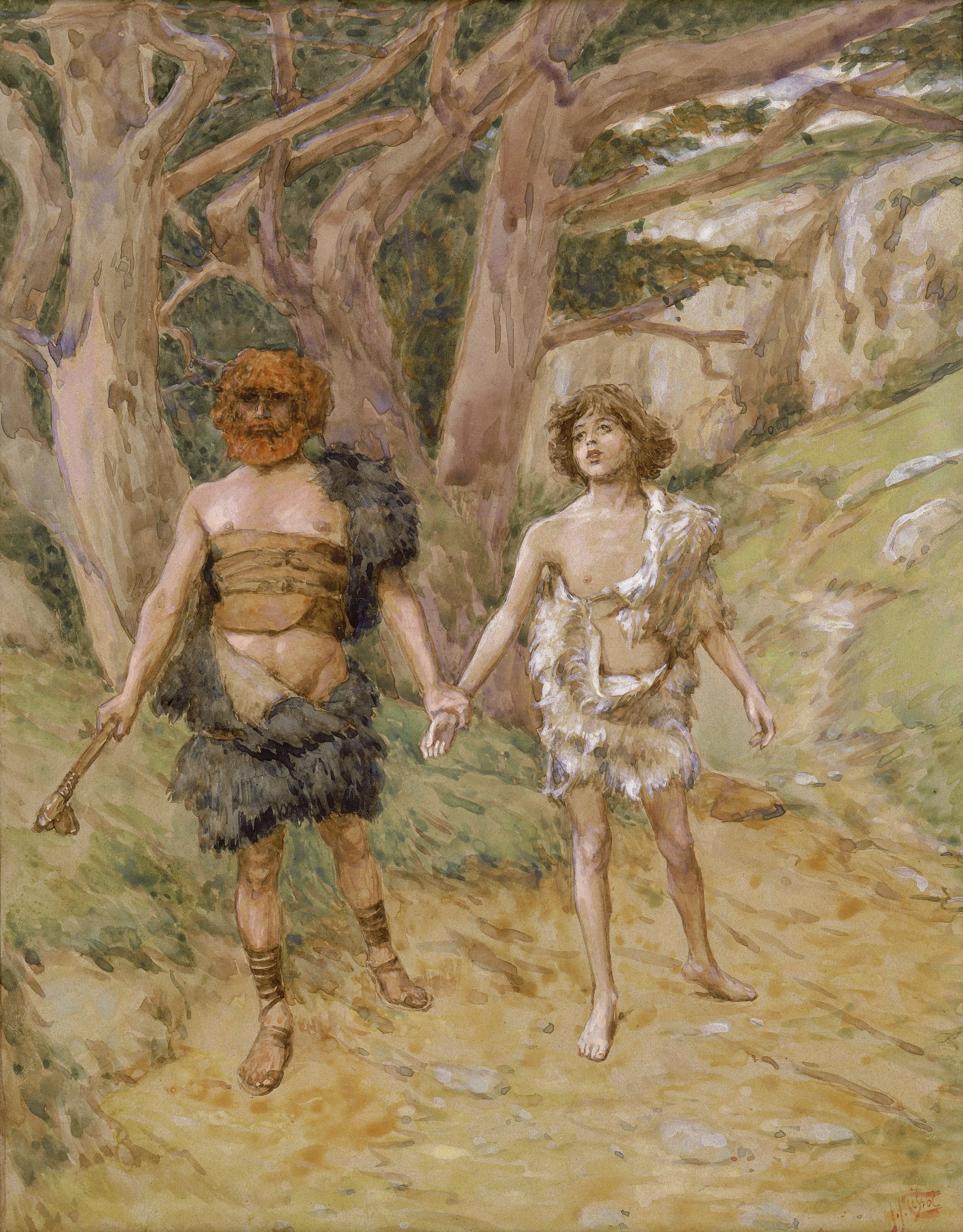
Cain leads Abel to Death, by James Tissot (1909)

The Book of Genesis in the Bible contains several examples of sibling rivalry: the story of Cain and Abel tells of one brother's jealousy after God appears to favor his sibling, and the jealousy ultimately leads to murder. Esau was jealous of his brother Jacob's inheritance and blessing; sisters Leah and Rachel compete for the love of Jacob; Joseph's brothers are so jealous that they effectively sell him into slavery. These stories are also present in the Qur'an.

Another example is provided in the myth of Romulus and Remus, wherein twin brothers Romulus and Remus fight for control over Rome, and which ends with the death of Remus at the hands of his brother.

=== In folk and fairy tales ===
Sibling rivalry, bitter jealousy, and envy are notable in several fairy tales around the world. In some tales, the jealousy escalates to outright murder of the successful sibling.

Some tale types, according to the Aarne-Thompson-Uther Index, heavily feature sibling and step-sibling rivalry as part of the plot:

- ATU 301, "The Three Stolen Princesses" or "Jean de l'Ours": a hero, born with strong powers, descends to an underworld realm to rescue three princesses. He sends the three maidens to the upper realm with the help of his brothers (or companions), but they cut the rope and trap him in the subterranean realm.
- ATU 361, "Bearskin": a man makes a deal with devil: must not pray or bathe for a certain number of years. Later, the man meets a father with his three daughters; only the youngest sister promises to marry the man. After the time is up, the man grooms himself and goes to meet his bride, explaining the whole story. Her sisters seethe with rage and explode with jealousy; the devil takes two souls, instead of one.
- ATU 403, "The Black and the White Bride": a woman, despised by her (step)family, marries a prince. Later, her step-mother conspires to replace the woman with her (step)sibling.
- ATU 432, "The Bird Lover" or "The Prince as Bird": a maiden is visited at night by a bird, which is a prince in disguise. Her family begin to suspect something and set up a trap by her window: they put spikes (nails, broken glass, thorns) to hurt the bird. The bird prince thinks her beloved betrayed him and flees, which prompts the heroine to seek him in parts unknown.
- ATU 480, "The Kind and Unkind Girls" or "The Spinning-Woman by the Spring": two sisters or stepsisters, one diligent and the other lazy, meet a supernatural entity in the woods or in a magical realm. The diligent sibling acts kindly and obeys the entity's orders, and is rewarded; the lazy one disobeys and is punished.
- ATU 510A, "Cinderella": the heroine is maltreated by her stepmother and stepsiblings.
- ATU 511, "One-Eye, Two-Eyes, and Three-Eyes": two women (the first one-eyed and the other three-eyed) mistreat their sibling, a woman with two eyes.
- ATU 530, "The Princess on the Glass Hill": a father sends his three sons to guard his crops or to hold a vigil on his grave. The older ones disobey and/or feel frightened, so they send their youngest brother, whom they call a fool or stupid, to fulfill their father's orders. The foolish brother acquires three magical horses and uses them to reach a princess atop a glass hill for three times.
  - ATU 530A, "The Pig With Golden Bristles": as a continuation of the story of The Glass Mountain, after the wedding, the tsar/king sends his sons-in-law on a quest for some creatures with marvellous attributes. The older brothers want to go on the quest to impress their father-in-law and further humiliate their youngest brother.
- ATU 550, "The Golden Bird": a king sends his three sons to find the golden bird and bring it home. The older ones fail, but the youngest is successful, capturing the bird and a horse and bringing with him a maiden as his wife. Spurred by intense jealousy, they murder their sibling or toss them in a ditch and take the prizes of the quest for themselves.
- ATU 551, "The Water of Life": a king is dying or blind, so he sends his sons for a magical cure (a magical bird, the water of life, etc.), which can only be found in a distant realm, in the hands of a princess or maiden. The youngest is successful and returns with the prize, but his brothers drop him in a ditch. The youngest prince survives and returns incognito to the city. The foreign maiden comes after the person who stole her property.
- ATU 554, "The Grateful Animals": in some variants, the youngest brother protects or helps three animals of different species, much to his brothers' chagrin, who wanted to hunt them. When the three brothers are assigned tasks by a king, the youngest accomplishes the feats with the animals' help.
- ATU 707, "The Three Golden Children": one night, the prince (king, tsar, sultan) hears three sisters talking, the youngest promising that, if she were to marry the king, would bear him children (twins, triplets) with wonderful attributes. Her sisters are married to lowly officials or servants of the king's court and, bearing an intense jealousy toward the newly crowned queen, decide to get rid of the royal children.
- ATU 709, "Snow White": in some regional variants of the tale type, the rivalry is not between mother and daughter or between step-mother and step-daughter. Instead, it is the heroine's older sisters who get jealous over the youngest's beauty and charm and conspire to kill her.
- ATU 780, "The Singing Bone": a person murders their sibling (brother or sister) and buries them in a shallow grave. A tree sprouts from it. Its wood is used to create an instrument (fiddle, violin, flute) that reveals the murder.

=== In literature ===
A number of Shakespeare's plays display situations of sibling rivalry. King Lear provokes rivalry among his three daughters by asking them to describe their love for him; in the same play, Edmund contrives to force his half-brother Edgar into exile. In The Taming of the Shrew, sisters Kate and Bianca are shown fighting bitterly. In Richard III, the title character is at least partially motivated by rivalry with his brother, King Edward. In As You Like It, there is obvious sibling rivalry and antagonism between Orlando and Oliver, and also between Duke Frederick and Duke Senior.

Most adaptations of Sherlock Holmes depict sibling rivalry with his brother, Mycroft Holmes.

In John Steinbeck's East of Eden, the brothers Cal and Aron Trask are counterparts to Cain and Abel of the Bible story.

A Song of Ice and Fire contains numerous examples, such as that between Stannis Baratheon and Renly Baratheon. After their eldest brother Robert Baratheon's death they contend for the Iron Throne, Stannis finally killing Renly through dark magic on the night before Renly intends to kill Stannis in battle, though it is left unclear whether he is aware of his role in Renly's death. The history of Westeros also contains "The Dance of the Dragons", in which Princess Rhaenyra Targaryen and her half-brother Aegon II Targaryen fought over the Iron Throne after their father Viserys I Targaryen's death.

=== In film and television ===
Sibling rivalry is a common theme in media that features child characters, reflecting the importance of this issue in early life. These issues can include jealousy on the birth of a new baby, different sibling roles, frequent arguments, competitiveness for mother's affection, and tensions between step-siblings.

Adult siblings can also be portrayed with a rivalrous relationship, often a continuation of childhood conflicts. Situation comedies exploit this to comic effect. Sibling relationships may be shown as alternately loving and argumentative. Brothers or sisters in a similar line of work may display professional rivalry. In serious drama, conflict between siblings can be fatal, as shown in crime dramas involving such rivalries. The tale of sibling rivalry has been a rich source of inspiration for filmmakers, evident in the cinematic brilliance of "Deewar" (1975) and the modern exploration found in "Kapoor & Sons" (2016).

=== Real life ===
Occasionally real life instances of sibling rivalry are publicized in the mass media. Siblings who play the same sport will often be compared with each other; for example, American football players Peyton and Eli Manning, or tennis players Venus and Serena Williams. Musicians Liam and Noel Gallagher of Oasis have a turbulent relationship, similar to that of Ray and Dave Davies of The Kinks. Politicians Ed and David Miliband are likewise portrayed as having a strained relationship, after Ed narrowly defeated David in the final round of the 2010 Labour Party leadership election.

Actresses Olivia de Havilland and Joan Fontaine had an uneasy relationship from childhood and in 1975 the sisters stopped speaking to each other completely. The incredibly popular singing Andrews Sisters maintained professional harmony in show business for more than 30 years, but clashed famously in their personal lives (after LaVerne's death in 1967, Patty and Maxene stopped speaking in 1975 and never looked back). The rivalry between singers Lata Mangeshkar and Asha Bhosle is often talked about in the Indian media, in spite of their insistence that these are just tales. Twin sisters and advice columnists Ann Landers and Abigail Van Buren had a relationship that was alternately very close and publicly antagonistic. Journalists Christopher and Peter Hitchens had many public disagreements and at least one protracted falling-out due to their differing political and religious views.

== See also ==
- Dassler brothers feud
- Birthright
- Birth order
- Family
- Firstborn
- Sibling abuse
- Emotional intelligence
- Sibling estrangement
