= Sibling estrangement =

Phenomenon in familial relationships

Sibling estrangement or sibling alienation is the breakdown of relationships between siblings resulting in a lack of communication or outright avoidance of each other. It is a phenomenon that can occur in families for various reasons such as unresolved conflicts, personality differences, distance, or life events. Similar to family estrangement, sibling estrangement is also linked to disruptive family events, such as parental divorce or the death of a family member. It includes emotional and physical distancing of siblings. It is a voluntary and intentional process in which at least one sibling creates or keeps distance from another sibling, triggered by a negative relationship between them. It can happen at different ages, in the majority of cases it happens during adulthood.

== Contributing causes ==
=== Childhood dynamics ===
Sibling alienation can be significantly influenced by childhood dynamics, such as sibling rivalry and parental favouritism. Siblings who experienced a lot of rivalry, resentment, and conflict as children are more likely to have strained relationships as adults. Parental favouritism can exacerbate this by causing resentment and escalating sibling conflict.

=== Personality differences ===
Sibling estrangement can result from personality differences, attachment styles, communication preferences, and life experiences, among other personal distinctions. Some personality characteristics, such as neuroticism or extraversion, make people more or less likely to experience sibling estrangement. Attachment theory suggests that early interactions with caregivers can shape a person's attachment style, which in turn can have an impact on their adult relationships. Individuals with insecure attachment patterns are more likely to experience alienation from their siblings in the context of sibling estrangement. Sibling relationships can be impacted by differences in communication methods, such as conflict resolution techniques or the ability to reveal personal information. Personality conflicts can result in disagreement, which is a frequent cause of estrangement.

=== Life events ===
Sibling estrangement can be significantly influenced by life events. An individual's capacity to sustain relationships with their siblings can be affected by a variety of circumstances, including the death of a parent or sibling, traumatic or abusive events, and mental health problems. For instance, a sibling who has experienced abuse may find it difficult to trust them or feel secure in their presence, which might result in alienation. The incidence and length of estrangement can be influenced by the seriousness and timing of these occurrences. Life events are just one of several factors that can contribute to sibling estrangement, and their precise role may vary depending on the specific circumstances of each case.

=== Miscommunication ===
Effective communication is essential for maintaining healthy sibling relationships. Poor communication, misunderstandings, and conflicts in communication styles can create barriers that make it difficult for siblings to connect and maintain a strong bond. In some cases, siblings may even avoid communication altogether, leading to a breakdown in their relationship. The importance of communication in sibling relationships makes it possible for estrangement to develop.

=== Trauma or abuse ===
Any form of sexual, emotional, or physical abuse that takes place between siblings is referred to as sibling abuse. This can involve destructive actions such as bullying, physical aggression, and verbal abuse. The impacts of sibling abuse can endure a lifetime for those affected, increasing their vulnerability to mental health disorders and interpersonal interaction troubles.

=== Mental illness/ substance use ===
Mental health and substance abuse can contribute to sibling estrangement in different ways. For instance, one sibling may keep their distance from a sibling who is battling addiction or mental illness. Some individuals may use estrangement as a way of coping with their own mental health or substance use issues. This could be brought on by the strain of handling the circumstance or worries about how it will affect other family members. Mental health issues could also affect the ability of siblings to communicate effectively, leading to misunderstandings and conflicts that can drive them apart. Sibling estrangement itself can be challenging and lead to eventual problems with mental health and substance abuse.

=== Genetic factors ===
Genetic relatedness has been established as a significant risk factor, despite the impact of childhood co-residence having a large impact on its significance. Full siblings are less likely to experience estrangement than half and step-siblings who lived together for at least half of their upbringing. Non-biological siblings who had little to no history of childhood co-residence are more likely than other siblings to become estranged from one another.

Certain genetic predispositions, such as temperament or personality traits, affect how siblings interact with each other and their ability to resolve conflicts. Heritable genetic disorders or conditions may increase the likelihood of sibling estrangement. This could be due to the various challenges and stressors associated with managing the condition, which can have an impact on the sibling relationship.

Not all siblings who encountered one of the mentioned causes will inevitably end up distant from one another. Some people might be able to resolve these problems and continue to have intimate connections, while others will not.

== Symptoms ==
Sibling estrangement can have long-term consequences for the affected individual's mental health. If left unaddressed, it can also have long-term implications for the children of estranged individuals, as well as their grandchildren.

The estrangement may present itself slowly over a longer period of time in the form of reduced communication until the estranging sibling completely stops all contact or it may manifest in a sudden cut-off in all communication.

Due to the lack of communication and resentment toward each other, it is highly likely that one or both of the siblings struggle with mental health issues. These mental health disorders have symptoms and can range from depression to eating disorders, anxiety, and even substance abuse.

Family is a close bond that a person has since birth, so it is very emotionally devastating when contact with one or more family members stops. This may lead to episodes of long-lasting sadness and feeling demotivated to improve the relationship with the sibling and hopeless for improvement. When not seeking help, this may turn into an actual depression disorder.

== Childhood ==
When siblings face a substantial breach or distance in their relationship during their formative years, it is referred to as sibling estrangement in childhood. Numerous things, including personality differences, jealousy, rivalry, parental favouritism, or family strife, might contribute to this. Childhood sibling alienation can have a long-lasting impact on a person's emotional growth and relationships in later life. Sibling alienation can cause emotions of loneliness, rejection, and low self-esteem in children, and it can make it difficult for them to build intimate relationships with other people. This study suggests that family conflict caused by things like parental remarriage, divorce, and step-sibling relationships were linked to higher degrees of sibling estrangement in childhood.

== Adolescence ==
Sibling estrangement occurs frequently throughout adolescence, with 15% to 20% of siblings reportedly experiencing severe estrangement at this time in their development. As adolescents explore their own identities and relationships with peers and parents, studies suggest that sibling relationships during adolescence are frequently marked by both closeness and conflict. The quality of the sibling relationship throughout adolescence can impact the psychological adjustment of the siblings and their relationship in adulthood.

=== Causes ===
There are factors that may result in sibling estrangement during puberty. For instance, sibling competition can cause estrangement because siblings feel frustrated or jealous of one another's successes or parental attention. A lack of communication and empathy between siblings can result from personality, preference, or disparities in values. Parental partiality worsens the bond between siblings.

Conflicts, particularly arguments or fights, harm sibling relationships permanently. Unresolved issues between siblings during adolescence have been linked to long-term estrangement. This is because siblings tend to hold onto negative feelings and memories. Parental divorce, remarriage, or important life events, such as moving or illness, can potentially disturb the sibling bond and lead to estrangement.

== Adulthood ==
Sibling estrangement in adulthood is caused by a variety of factors including issues originating from childhood such as rivalry and parental favouritism. These causes can also lead to an earlier form of estrangement in childhood and/or unfavourable and negative feelings between siblings which can build up over a longer period of time during the individuals’ youth, resulting in alienation after reaching adulthood.

During adulthood, sibling estrangement seems to be a more temporary phenomenon. Single episodes of estrangement may occur, while multiple episodes are rarer. The vulnerability of sibling relationships seems to increase over time, where older people report being estranged from siblings more often than younger ones. Sibling estrangement can be seen as a healthy coping mechanism for family situations, which can allow for the reconciliation of sibling relationships.
