= Perfect Tides: Station to Station =

2026 video game

- Developer: Three Bees (Note: Console version co-developed by Click Pulp)
- Publisher: Three Bees
- Director: Meredith Gran
- Writer: Meredith Gran
- Composer: Daniel Kobylarz
- Engine: Adventure Game Studio
- Platforms: macOS; Windows; Nintendo Switch
- Release: macOS, Windows; 22 January 2026; Nintendo Switch; 14 May 2026
- Genre: Point-and-click adventure game
- Mode: Single-player

Perfect Tides: Station to Station is a semi-autobiographical 2026 narrative point-and-click adventure game. It was developed by studio Three Bees and written and directed by Meredith Gran. Set in the year 2003, the game follows Mara Whitefish, a college freshman living in The City.

The game started crowdfunding in 2022. It was favorably reviewed upon its release on 22 January 2026. A port to Nintendo Switch was released on 14 May 2026.

The previous game in the series, Perfect Tides, released in 2022.

== Synopsis ==
Perfect Tides: Station to Station follows college freshman Mara Whitefish through a year of her life. She studies creative writing at a large university in The City and dreams of becoming a writer. Commuting to school by train every day from her mom's apartment, Mara struggles to balance her family, friends, relationships, and schoolwork. She spends her time writing, reading, exploring The City, and navigating a series of increasingly-complex romantic relationships.

== Gameplay ==
Perfect Tides: Station to Station is a 2D point-and-click adventure game. The player uses inventory items and talks to other characters to complete tasks and advance the story. As Mara explores, she develops her thoughts on a series of "topics," everything from Anarchism to drugs to movies. Her levels in these topics influence the story and inform how her writing projects turn out.

== Development ==
Developer Three Bees is based in Philadelphia. The Kickstarter campaign was launched in August 2022 and reached its initial goal of $80,000. The game was developed in Adventure Game Studio. Perfect Tides: Station to Station is Three Bees' second game, after its predecessor Perfect Tides.

== Reception ==
Reception

Aggregate score
Aggregator	Score
OpenCritic	94% recommend (Note: Based on 16 reviews.)

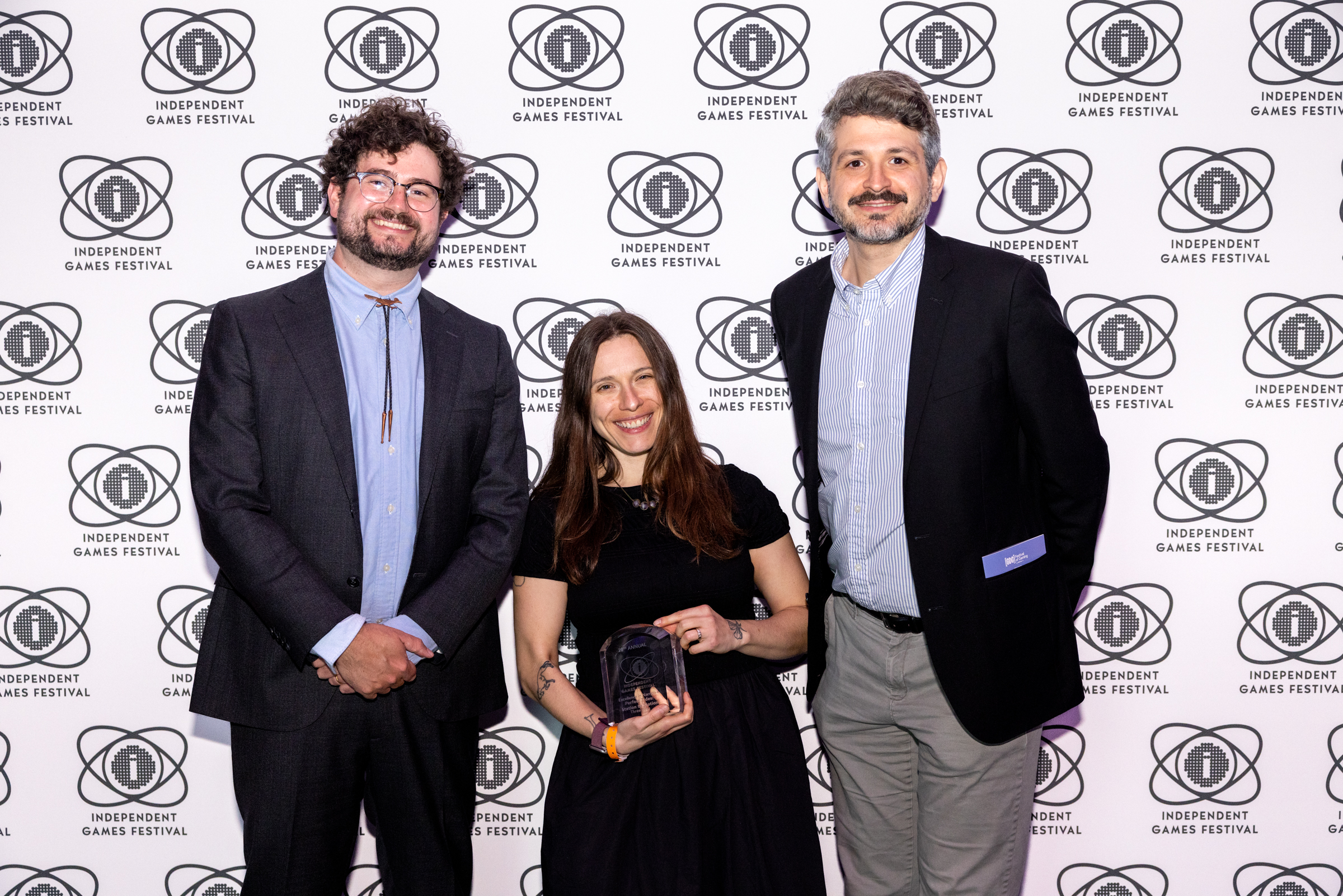
Three Bees won the Excellence in Narrative award at the 2026 Independent Games Festival

The game was positively received upon its release. A.V. Club praised the narrative and writing, saying it "feels like a more mature evolution on what came before." Polygon praised the game's unique writing mechanic and calls it "a proud ode to millennial cringe in all its saccharine sincerity."

In 2026, Perfect Tides: Station to Station was nominated for two Independent Games Festival awards: Narrative Excellence and the Seumas McNally Grand Prize. It won the Narrative Excellence award.
