= Sibling relationship =

Relationship between siblings

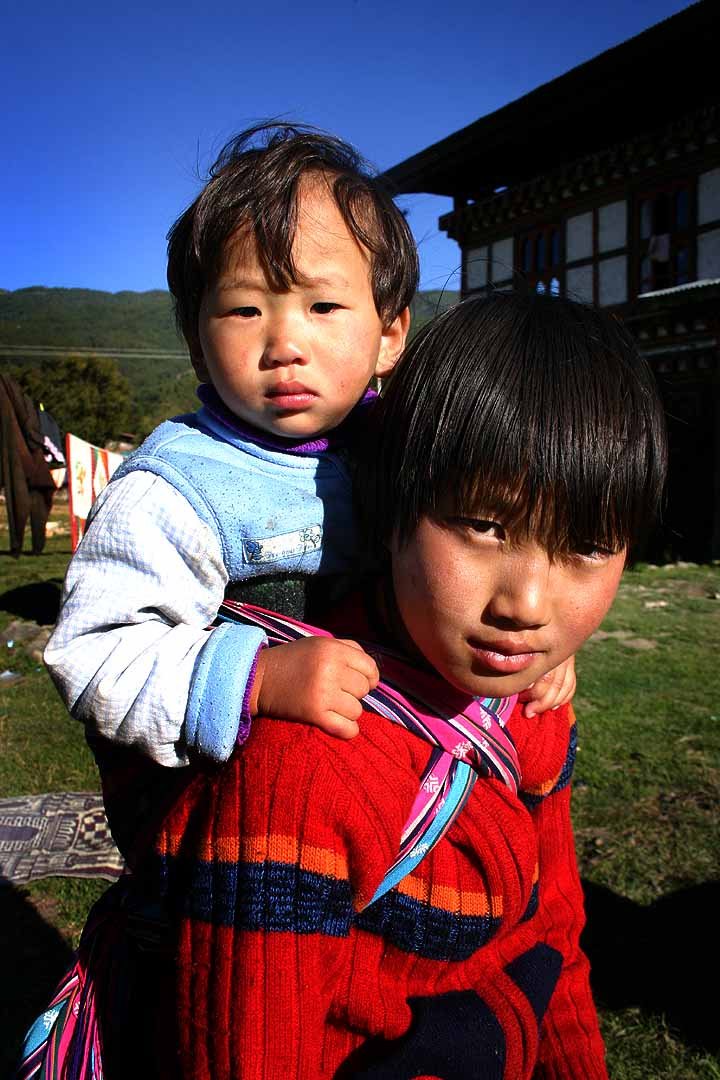
Siblings in Bhutan

Siblings play a unique role in one another's lives that simulates the companionship of parents as well as the influence and assistance of friends. Because siblings often grow up in the same household, they have a large amount of exposure to one another, like other members of the immediate family. However, though a sibling relationship can have both hierarchical and reciprocal elements, this relationship tends to be more egalitarian and symmetrical than with family members of other generations. Furthermore, sibling relationships often reflect the overall condition of cohesiveness within a family.

Siblings normally spend more time with each other during their childhood than they do with parents or anyone else; they trust and cherish each other, so betrayal by one sibling could cause problems for that person physically as well as mentally and emotionally. Sibling relationships are often the longest-lasting relationship in individuals' lives.

== Cultural differences ==
The content and context of sibling relationships varies between cultures. In industrialized cultures, sibling relationships are typically discretionary. People are encouraged to stay in contact and cooperate with their brothers and sisters, but this is not an obligation. Older siblings in these cultures are sometimes given responsibilities to watch over a younger sibling, but this is only occasional, with parents taking on the primary role of caretaker. In contrast, close sibling relationships in nonindustrialized cultures are often obligatory, with strong cultural norms prompting cooperation and close proximity between siblings. In India, the brother-sister sibling relationship is celebrated in a festival called Raksha Bandhan. At this event, the sister presents the brother with a woven bracelet to show their lasting bond even when they have raised their own families.

== Throughout the lifespan ==
=== Infancy and childhood ===
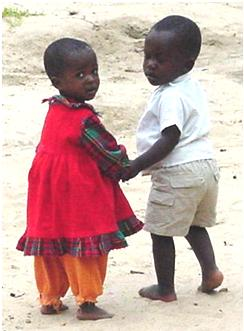
Sibling care at orphanage in Zimbabwe

A relationship begins with the introduction of two siblings to one another. Older siblings are often made aware of their soon-to-be younger brother or sister at some point during their mother's pregnancy, which may help facilitate adjustment for the older child and result in a better immediate relationship with the newborn. Parents pay attention not only to the newborns but to the older children to avoid sibling rivalry; interactions that can contribute to the older sibling's social aptitude can cognitively stimulate the younger sibling. Older siblings even adapt their speech to accommodate for the low language comprehension of the younger sibling, much like parents do with baby talk.

The attachment theory used to describe an infant's relationship to a primary caregiver may also be applied to siblings. If an infant finds an older sibling to be responsive and sees him or her as a source of comfort, a supportive bond may form. On the contrary, a negative bond may form if the older sibling acts in an aggressive, neglectful, or otherwise negative manner. Sibling attachment is further accentuated in the absence of a primary caregiver when the younger sibling must rely on the older one for security and support.

Even as siblings age and develop, their relationships have considerable stability from infancy through middle childhood, during which positive and negative interactions remain constant in frequency. Still, this time period marks great changes for both siblings. Assuming an age gap of only a few years, this marks the time when the older sibling is beginning school, meeting peers, and making friends. This shift in environment reduces both children's access to one another and depletes the older sibling's dependency on the younger for social support, which can now be found outside the relationship. When the younger sibling begins school, the older sibling may help him or her become acclimated and advise on the new struggles that come with being a student. At the same time, the older sibling is also available to answer questions and discuss topics that the younger sibling may not feel comfortable bringing up with a parent.

=== Adolescence ===
The nature of sibling relationships changes from childhood to adolescence. While young adolescents often provide one another with warmth and support, this period of development is also marked by increased conflict and emotional distance. However, this effect varies based on the sex of siblings. Mixed-sex sibling pairs often experience more drastic decreases in intimacy during adolescence, while same-sex sibling pairs experience a slight rise in intimacy during early adolescence followed by a slight drop. In both instances, intimacy once again increases during young adulthood. This trend may be the result of an increased emphasis on peer relationships during adolescence. Often, adolescents from the same family adopt differing lifestyles which further contributes to emotional distance between one another.

Siblings may influence one another in much the same way that peers do, especially during adolescence. These relationships may even compensate for the negative psychological impact of not having friends and may provide individuals with a sense of self-worth. Older siblings can effectively model good behaviour for younger siblings. For instance, there is evidence that communication about safe sex with a sibling may be just as effective as with a parent. Conversely, an older sibling may encourage risky sexual behaviour by modelling a sexually advanced lifestyle, and younger siblings of teen parents are more likely to become teen parents themselves.

Research on adolescents suggests positive sibling influences can promote healthy and adaptive functioning while negative interactions can increase vulnerabilities and problem behaviours. Intimate and positive sibling interactions are an important source of support for adolescents and can promote the development of prosocial behaviour. However, when sibling relationships are characterized by conflict and aggression, they can promote delinquency, and antisocial behaviour among peers.

=== Adulthood and old age ===
When siblings reach adulthood, it is more likely that they will no longer live in the same place and that they will become involved in jobs, hobbies, and romantic interests that they do not share and therefore cannot use to relate to one another. In this stage the common struggles of school and being under the strict jurisdiction of parents is dissolved. Despite these factors, siblings often maintain a relationship through adulthood and even old age. Proximity is a large factor in maintaining contact between siblings; those who live closer to one another are more likely to visit each other frequently. In addition, gender also plays a significant role. Sisters are most likely to maintain contact with one another, followed by mixed-gender dyads. Brothers are least likely to contact one another frequently.

Communication is especially important when siblings do not live near one another. Communication may take place in person, over the phone, by mail, and with increasing frequency, by means of online communication such as email and social networking. Often, siblings will communicate indirectly through a parent, a mutual friend or a relative. Between adult and elderly siblings, conversations tend to focus on family happenings and reflections of the past.

In adulthood, siblings still perform a role similar to that of friends. Friends and siblings are often similar in age, with any age gap seeming even less significant in adulthood. Furthermore, both relationships are often egalitarian in nature, although unlike sibling relationships, friendships are voluntary. The specific roles of each relationship also differ, especially later in life. For elderly siblings, friends tend to act as companions while siblings play the roles of confidants.

It is difficult to make long-term assumptions about adult sibling relationships, as they may rapidly change in response to individual or shared life events. Marriage of one sibling may either strengthen or weaken the sibling bond. The same can be said for change of location, birth of a child, and numerous other life events. However, divorce or widowhood of one sibling or death of a close family member most often results in increased closeness and support between siblings.

=== Family system ===
Sibling relationships are important within the family system. Family systems theory (Kerr and Bowen, 1988) is a theory of human behavior that defines the family unit as a complex social system, in which members interact to influence each other's behavior These relationships have an effect on child development, behavior, and support throughout their life span. A child's development is influenced by the dynamic system as a result of the family system. The relationship between siblings is the most important, but isn't focused on as much as other family relationships. Within the family system, not all roles amongst siblings are the same or shared. An older sibling can be placed in a position to fulfill the shoes of a parental role. This makes the older sibling a role model and caretaker to the younger sibling. A positive impact on the younger siblings' development may occur.

== Sibling rivalry ==
Sibling rivalry describes the competitive relationship or animosity between siblings, blood-related or not. Often competition is the result of a desire for greater attention from parents. However, even the most conscientious parents can expect to see sibling rivalry in play to a degree. Children tend to naturally compete with each other for not only attention from parents but for recognition in the world.

Siblings generally spend more time together during childhood than they do with parents. The sibling bond is often complicated and is influenced by factors such as parental treatment, birth order, personality, and people and experiences outside the family. According to child psychologist Sylvia Rimm, sibling rivalry is particularly intense when children are very close in age and of the same gender, or where one child is intellectually gifted. Sibling rivalry involves aggression and insults, especially between siblings close in age.

=== Causes ===
Siblings may be jealous of and harbor resentment toward one another. The main causes of sibling rivalry are lack of social skills, concerns with fairness, individual temperaments, special needs, parenting style, parent's conflict resolution skills and culture. In many families, the children count their siblings among their friends. But it's also common for siblings to be great friends on one day and hateful to one another on the next.

There are many things that can influence and shape sibling rivalry. According to Kyla Boyse from the University of Michigan, each child in a family competes to define who they are as individuals and want to show that they are separate from their siblings. Children may feel they are getting unequal amounts of their parents' attention, discipline, and responsiveness. Children fight more in families where there is no understanding that fighting is not an acceptable way to resolve conflicts, and no alternative ways of handling such conflicts. Stress in the parents' and children's lives can create more conflict and increase sibling rivalry.

==== Psychoanalytic view ====
Sigmund Freud saw the sibling relationship as an extension of the Oedipus complex, where brothers were in competition for their mother's attention and sisters for their father's. For example, in the case of Little Hans, Freud postulated that the young boy's fear of horses was related to jealousy of his baby sister, as well as the boy's desire to replace his father as his mother's mate. This view has been largely discredited by modern research.

==== Parent-offspring conflict theory ====
Formulated by Robert Trivers, parent-offspring theory is important for understanding sibling dynamics and parental decision-making. Because parents are expected to invest whatever is necessary to ensure the survival of their offspring, it is generally thought that parents will allocate the maximum amount of resources available, possibly to their own detriment and that of other potential offspring. While parents are investing as much as possible to their offspring, offspring may at the same time attempt to obtain more resources than the parents are able to give to maximize its own reproductive success. Therefore, there is a conflict between the wants of the individual offspring and what the parent is able or willing to give. An extension of Trivers' theory leads to predict that it will pay siblings to compete intensely with one another. It can pay to be selfish even to the detriment of not only one's parents but also to one's siblings, as long as the total fitness benefits of doing do outweigh the total costs.

==== Other psychological approaches ====
Alfred Adler saw siblings as "striving for significance" within the family and felt that birth order was an important aspect of personality development. The feeling of being replaced or supplanted is often the cause of jealousy on the part of the older sibling. In fact, psychologists and researchers today endorse the influence of birth order, as well as age and gender constellations, on sibling relationships. A child's personality can also have an effect on how much sibling rivalry will occur in a home. Some kids seem to naturally accept changes, while others may be naturally competitive, and exhibit this nature long before a sibling enters the home. However, parents are seen as capable of having an important influence on whether they are competitive or not.

David Levy introduced the term "sibling rivalry" in 1941, claiming that for an older sibling "the aggressive response to the new baby is so typical that it is safe to say it is a common feature of family life." Researchers today generally endorse this view, noting that parents can ameliorate this response by being vigilant to favoritism and by taking appropriate preventative steps. In fact, say researchers, the ideal time to lay the groundwork for a lifetime of supportive relationships between siblings is during the months prior to the new baby's arrival.

=== Throughout life ===
According to observational studies by Judy Dunn, children as early as one may be able to exhibit self-awareness and perceive difference in parental treatment between themselves and a sibling and early impressions can shape a lifetime relationship with the younger sibling. From 18 months on siblings can understand family rules and know how to comfort and be kind to each other. By 3 years old, children have a sophisticated grasp of social rules, can evaluate themselves in relation to their siblings, and know how to adapt to circumstances within the family. Whether they have the drive to adapt, to get along with a sibling whose goals and interests may be different from their own, can make the difference between a cooperative relationship and a rivalrous one.

Studies have further shown that the greatest sibling rivalry tends to be shown between brothers, and the least between sisters. Naturally, there are exceptions to this rule. What makes brother/brother ties so rivalrous? Deborah Gold has launched a new study that is not yet completed. But she has found a consistent theme running through the interviews she's conducted thus far. "The thing that rides through with brothers that doesn't come across in other sibling pairs is this notion of parental and societal comparison. Somehow with boys, it seems far more natural to compare them, especially more than with sister/brother pairs. Almost from day one, the fundamental developmental markers—who gets a tooth first, who crawls, walks, speaks first—are held up on a larger-than-life scale. And this comparison appears to continue from school to college to the workplace. Who has the biggest house, who makes the most money, drives the best car are constant topics of discussion. In our society, men are supposed to be achievement-oriented, aggressive. They're supposed to succeed."

Sibling rivalry often continues throughout childhood and can be very frustrating and stressful to parents. Adolescents fight for the same reasons younger children fight, but they are better equipped physically and intellectually to hurt and be hurt by each other. Physical and emotional changes cause pressures in the teenage years, as do changing relationships with parents and friends. Fighting with siblings as a way to get parental attention may increase in adolescence. One study found that the age group 10 to 15 reported the highest level of competition between siblings.

However, the degree of sibling rivalry and conflict is not constant. Longitudinal studies looking at the degree of sibling rivalry throughout childhood from Western societies suggest that, over time, sibling relationships become more egalitarian and this suggest less conflict. Yet, this effect is moderated by birth order: Older siblings report more or less the same level of conflict and rivalry throughout their childhood. In contrast, young siblings report a peak in conflict and rivalry around young adolescence and a drop in late adolescence. The decline in late adolescence makes sense from an evolutionary perspective: Once resources cease and/ or individuals have started their own reproductive career, it makes little sense for sibling to continue fierce competition over resources that do not affect their reproductive success anymore.

Sibling rivalry can continue into adulthood and sibling relationships can change dramatically over the years. Events such as a parent's illness may bring siblings closer together, whereas marriage may drive them apart, particularly if the in-law relationship is strained. Approximately one-third of adults describe their relationship with siblings as rivalrous or distant. However, rivalry often lessens over time. At least 80 percent of siblings over age 60 enjoy close ties.

=== Prevention ===
Parents can reduce the opportunity for rivalry by refusing to compare or typecast their children, teaching the children positive ways to get attention from each other and from the parent, planning fun family activities together, and making sure each child has enough time and space of their own. They can also give each child individual attention, encourage teamwork, refuse to hold up one child as a role model for the others, and avoid favoritism. It is also important for parents to invest in time spent together as a whole family. Children who have a strong sense of being part of a family are likely to see siblings as an extension of themselves. However, according to Sylvia Rimm, although sibling rivalry can be reduced it is unlikely to be eliminated. In moderate doses, rivalry may be a healthy indication that each child is assertive enough to express his or her differences with other siblings.

Weihe suggests that four criteria should be used to determine if questionable behavior is rivalry or sibling abuse. First, one must determine if the questionable behavior is age appropriate: e.g., children use different conflict-resolution tactics during various developmental stages. Second, one must determine if the behavior is an isolated incident or part of an enduring pattern: abuse is, by definition, a long-term pattern rather than occasional disagreements. Third, one must determine if there is an "aspect of victimization" to the behavior: rivalry tends to be incident-specific, reciprocal and obvious to others, while abuse is characterized by secrecy and an imbalance of power. Fourth, one must determine the goal of the questionable behavior: the goal of abuse tends to be embarrassment or domination of the victim. Parents should remember that sibling rivalry today may someday result in siblings being cut off from each other when the parents are gone. Continuing to encourage family togetherness, treating siblings equitably, and using family counseling to help arrest sibling rivalry that is excessive may ultimately serve children in their adult years.

== Sibling marriage and incest ==
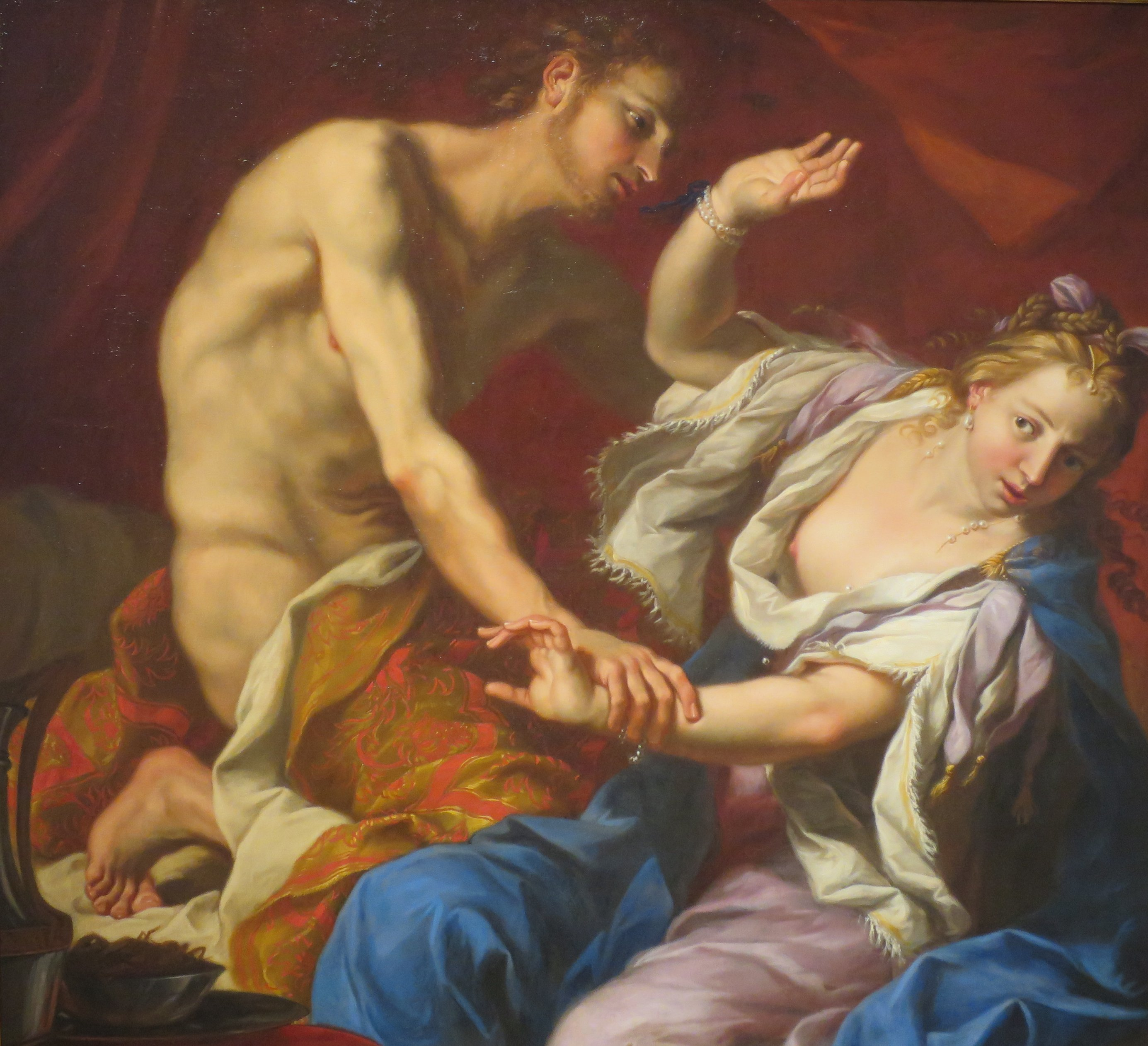
Amnon and Tamar, children of the biblical King David

While cousin marriage is legal in most countries, and avunculate marriage is legal in many, sexual relations between siblings are considered incestuous almost universally. Innate sexual aversion between siblings forms due to close association in childhood, in what is known as the Westermarck effect. Children who grow up together do not normally develop sexual attraction, even if they are unrelated, and conversely, siblings who were separated at a young age may develop sexual attraction.

Thus, many cases of sibling incest, including accidental incest, concern siblings who were separated at birth or at a very young age. One study from New England has shown that roughly 10% of males and 15% of females had experienced some form of sexual contact with a brother or sister, with the most common form being fondling or touching of one another's genitalia.

=== Among adults ===
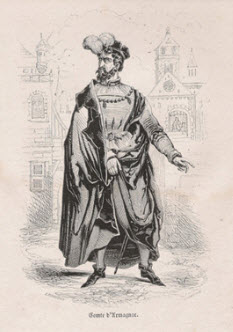
John V, Count of Armagnac married his sister Isabelle c. 1450.

John M. Goggin and William C. Sturtevant listed eight societies which generally allowed sibling marriage, and thirty-four societies where sibling marriage was permissible among certain classes.

A historical marriage that took place between full siblings was that between John V, Count of Armagnac and Isabelle d'Armagnac, dame des Quatre-Vallées, c. 1450. The provided papal dispensation for this union was declared forged in 1457. The marriage was declared invalid and the children were declared bastards and removed from the line of succession.

In antiquity, Laodice IV, a Seleucid princess, priestess, and queen, married all three of her brothers in turn. Sibling marriage was especially frequent in Roman Egypt, and probably even the preferred norm among the nobility. In most cases, marriage of siblings in Roman Egypt was a result of the religious belief in divinity and maintaining purity. Based on the model from the myth of Osiris and Isis, it was considered necessary for a god to marry a goddess and vice versa. This led to Osiris marrying his sister Isis due to limited options of gods and goddesses to marry. In order to preserve the divinity of ruling families, siblings of the royal families would marry each other.

Sibling marriage is also common among the Zande people of Central Africa.

In a number of European countries such as Belgium, France, Luxembourg, the Netherlands and Spain, marriage between siblings remains prohibited, but incest between siblings is no longer prosecuted.

=== Among children ===
According to Cavanagh Johnson & Friend (1995), between 40 and 75% of children will engage in some sort of sexual behavior before reaching 13 years of age. In these situations, children are exploring each other's bodies while also exploring gender roles and behaviors, and their sexual experimentation does not indicate that these children are child sex offenders. As siblings are generally close in age and locational proximity, the opportunity for sexual exploration between siblings is fairly high and that, if simply based on mutual curiosity, then these activities are not harmful or distressing, either in childhood or later in adulthood. According to Reinisch (1990), studying early sexual behavior generally, over half of all six- and seven-year-old boys have engaged in sex play with other boys, and more than a third of them with girls, while more than a third of six- and seven-year-old girls have engaged in such play with both other girls and with boys. This play includes playing doctor, mutual touching, and attempts at simulated, non-penetrative intercourse. Reinisch views such play as part of a normal progression from the sensual elements of bonding with parents, to masturbation, and then to sex play with others. By the age of eight or nine, according to Reinisch, children become aware that sexual arousal is a specific type of erotic sensation, and will seek these pleasurable experiences through various sights, self-touches, and fantasy, so that earlier generalized sex play shifts into more deliberate and intentional arousal.

Abusive incestuous relationships between siblings can have adverse effects on the parties involved. Such abuse can leave victims detrimentally hindered in developmental processes, such as those necessary for interpersonal relations, and can be the cause for depression, anxiety, and substance abuse in the victim's adult life. Definitions used have varied widely. Child sexual abuse between siblings is defined by the (US) National Task Force on Juvenile Sexual Offending as: sexual acts initiated by one sibling toward another without the other's consent, by use of force or coercion, or where there is a power differential between the siblings. In Caffaro & Conn-Caffaro (1998), sibling child sexual abuse is defined as "sexual behavior between siblings that is not age appropriate, not transitory, and not motivated by developmentally, mutually appropriate curiosity". When child sexual experimentation is carried out with siblings, some researchers, e.g. Bank & Kahn (1982), do consider it incest, but those researchers who do use that term distinguish between abusive incest and non-abusive incest. Bank and Kahn say that abusive incest is power-oriented, sadistic, exploitative, and coercive, often including deliberate physical or mental abuse.

== See also ==
- Siblings Day
- Sibling estrangement
