= Disownment =

Legal term for parents not accepting own child/children

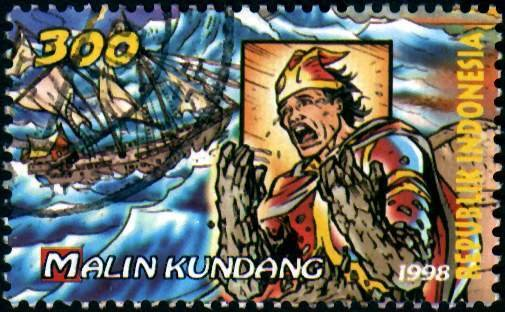
In a popular Indonesian folk tale, a boy disowns his mother, for which the God curses him and turns him into a stone.

Disownment occurs when a parent, sibling, or relative renounces or no longer accepts a child or relative as a family member. It might be due to actions perceived as reprehensible or lead to severe emotional consequences. Different from giving a child up for adoption, disownment is a social and interpersonal act and may take place later in the child's life, which means that the disowned child would have to make arrangements for future care. Among other things, it implies no responsibility for future care, making it similar to divorce or repudiation (of a spouse), meaning that the disowned child would have to find another residence to call home and be cared for.

Disownment may entail disinheritance, familial exile, or shunning, or all three. A disowned child might no longer be welcome in their former family's home or be allowed to attend major family events. Conversely, a child might themselves seek to disown their parents or family through some form of emancipation.

In some countries, disownment of a child is a form of child abandonment and is illegal when the child is a minor. Some countries condition a legal right of disownment within the family on evidence of specific familial conditions, such as an absence of normal familial ties (required in Austria), or abuse on the part of the person sought to be disowned (required in Spain).

In Roman law, the rights called patria potestas included power of disownment. As to Italian law, see article 224 of the Civil Code. There was a process for disownment amongst the Tanala of Ikongo, and disownment was inflicted as a punishment by the antandroy. There was provision for disownment in the Code of Hammurabi. In Louisiana, the right to disown a child was called action en desaveu.

In some cases, society and its institutions will accept an act of disownment.

== See also ==
- Family estrangement
- Honor killing
