= Birthright (disambiguation) =

Birthright is the concept of things being due to a person upon or by fact of their birth, or due to the order of their birth.

Birthright(s) may also refer to:

== Film and television ==
=== Film ===
- Birthright (1920 film) directed by Edward L. Hemmer and written by Maibelle Heikes Justice
- Birthright (1924 film), a silent film by Oscar Micheaux
- Birthright (1939 film), a sound remake of the 1924 film also by Oscar Micheaux
- Birthright (2010 film), a Japanese horror film
- "Birthright", a 2022 short film by Jade O'Belle
- Birthright (2025 film), an Australian satirical comedy directed by Zoe Pepper

=== Television ===
- "Birthright" (The Outer Limits), a 1995 episode of The Outer Limits
- "Birthright" (Star Trek: The Next Generation), a 1993 episode of Star Trek: The Next Generation
- "Birthright" (Stargate SG-1), an episode of Stargate SG-1
- Birthrights (TV series), a 1991–1993 BBC2 TV series

== Literature ==
=== Novels ===
- Birthright, a 1922 novel by Thomas Sigismund Stribling
- Birthright, a 1975 novel by Kathleen Sky
- Birthright: The Book of Man, a 1982 science fiction novel by Mike Resnick
- Birthright (Robinson novel), a 1993 Doctor Who novel
- Birthright (Diablo novel), a 2006 novel by Richard A. Knaak

=== Other literature ===
- Birthright (Abraham book), a 2020 poetry book by George Abraham
- Birthrights (play), a 2003 play by David Williamson

=== Comics ===
- Birthright (comic book), a 2014 comic book series by Joshua Williamson, Andrei Bressan, and Adriano Lucas
- Superman: Birthright, a 2003 comic book series by Mark Waid and Leinil Francis Yu

== Music ==
- Le droit d'aînesse or The Birthright, an opéra bouffe that premiered in 1883
- Birthright (album), a 2005 album by James Blood Ulmer
- "Birthright", a 1986 song by Samhain from Samhain III: November-Coming-Fire
- "Birthright", a 2005 song by A-ha from Analogue (album)
- "Birthright", a 2012 song by Celldweller from Wish Upon a Blackstar

== Other uses ==
- Birthright, Texas, an unincorporated community
- Birthright (campaign setting), a setting for Dungeons & Dragons
  - Birthright: The Gorgon's Alliance, a 1996 video game based on Dungeons & Dragons
- Birthright International, an organization of crisis pregnancy centers
- Birthright Israel, a program offering free trips to Israel for young Jews
- Birthright Unplugged, a program set up in response to Birthright Israel
- Birthright, Inc., an American eugenics organization
- Charles and Bettie Birthright, an African American married couple who lived in Clarkton, Missouri, US, in the 19th century

== See also ==
- Jus soli, the right of anyone born in the territory of a state to nationality or citizenship
  - Birthright citizenship in the United States
