= Psychological punishment =

Punishment intended to cause mental pain

Psychological punishments are punishments that aim to cause mental pain or discomfort in order to punish an individual. Psychological punishments are usually designed to cause discomfort or pain through creating negative emotions such as humiliation, shame and fear within an individual or by depriving the individual of sensory and/or social stimulation.

Some methods of corporal punishment, such as public flagellation, are designed to have the effects of psychological punishment as a secondary effect to the main punishment and as such the two methods can and are combined. Historically there has not been a distinct separation of pure psychological punishment without an element of physical harm as a formal type of punishment.

Psychological punishments that are particularly cruel and severe may be regarded as psychological torture; for example, the United Nations has stated that placing someone in solitary confinement for periods exceeding 15 consecutive days constitutes torture.

Methods of psychological punishment include:

- Solitary confinement
- White torture
- Public shaming
- Stocks
- Corporal punishments conducted in public

== Aims and effects of psychological punishment ==
=== Individual ===
Punishments aim to alter behaviour considered defective or undesirable by trying to associate the behaviour with the feelings caused by an unpleasant stimulus through a process called operant conditioning. Following a behaviour that is deemed undesirable an unpleasant stimulus will be administered to the individual who carried out the behaviour in order to try and induce a negative emotional response. Once the association between the behaviour and unpleasant stimulus is made the individual should learn that the outcome of a behaviour will result in an unpleasant set of emotions or feelings that outweigh the benefits gained by the undesirable behaviour and this should cause the punished individual to cease the behaviour. Within the context of psychological punishment the unpleasant stimulus relates to the method of punishment intended to have unpleasant psychological effects upon the punished individual.

Punishments involving public humiliation may also seek to ostracise the punished individual from society by labelling the individual as a 'deviant' or untrustworthy which would tarnish their reputation therefore making life within that society harder for them and serving as an additional long-term effect of the punishment. Recovering social status or dignity following a publicly humiliating punishment can be very difficult resulting in a lesser place within the social hierarchy if not an inability to reintegrate within the society resulting in social exclusion. In the past or in undeveloped societies where one has to rely on social support for survival or advancement in life, becoming an outcast could be an effective death sentence and it removes the 'safety-net' that a society can provide whilst potentially making the individual a target for crime or exclusion from social events. Due to changing public opinions the feature of public humiliation in punishments is now very rare.

=== Wider society ===
Punishment may be used to deter potential future offenders by showing them what the consequences of breaking the societal rules may be and encourage conformity to the norms within the society. Through vicarious learning one may see the outcome of a behaviour and decide whether or not they want to repeat the same behaviour based on the outcomes that they have observed therefore allowing them to determine whether or not the behaviour may be worthwhile without needing to carry out and incur the cost of the action themselves. Should someone observe someone that they may be modelling, or thinking about modelling, their behaviour off of being punished the desire to replicate the same behaviour may be counteracted by the suppressive effects of the potential negative outcomes of the action therefore discouraging the person from proceeding with the action. This is part of the reason why, historically, some punishments have been particularly brutal in order to have a greater deterrent effect - notable examples of this include the executions of Balthasar Gérard or Guy Fawkes. As humans can learn vicariously through observing other people punishment can make for a highly useful tool to deter undesirable behaviour and encourage following social norms.

Ensuring the vicarious effects of punishment are maximised may be done by increasing the social presence of the punishment. Punishments have historically been conducted in public places such as town squares in order to maximise the social presence of the punishment and ensure that word of the punishment could spread in a time before mass media existed. Conducting the punishment in public also helps the society in which it is occurring label the individual being punished as a 'deviant' or untrustworthy individual promoting the exclusion of the individual from society further reinforcing the need for people to conform to the societies norms in order to remain part of the society.

== Modern psychological punishments ==
=== Solitary confinement ===
Defined by the United Nations as "the confinement of prisoners for 22 hours or more a day without meaningful human contact" solitary confinement is one of the most prevalent psychological punishments used in western countries with there being at least 80,000 prisoners in the United States being held in solitary confinement alone. Depending on country, prisoners may be subjected to solitary confinement at the discretion of prison guards and it is the most severe non-capital punishment one can receive.

==== Efficacy ====
Solitary confinement is a controversial punishment that some claim to be ineffective at preventing undesirable behaviour in prisoners in addition to being inhuman. Research has suggested that the efficacy of short-term exposure to solitary confinement upon violent inmates is rather limited with it appearing that no significant differences in behaviour between inmates sent to solitary confinement and those who were not. Additionally it has been well documented that long-term exposure to solitary confinement (or similar conditions) can lead to a variety of mental health issues including self-harming, depression, anger and hypersensitivity which severely impacts the prisoners ability to reintegrate into society once their sentence is complete.
