= Birthright Unplugged =

- Formation: 2003; 23 years ago
- Headquarters: Oakland, California
- Director: Dunya Alwan
- Budget: $6,950 (2020)
- Website: birthrightunplugged.org

Birthright Unplugged is a nonprofit organization founded as a response to the Birthright Israel trips. The name "Birthright Unplugged" is a spin on the "Birthright Israel" program.

== History and organization ==
According to Birthright Unplugged, it was founded in 2003 by Dunya Alwan and Hannah Mermelstein. Alwan, an Iraqi-American of Muslim and Jewish descent, serves as the organization's current director.

In 2005, Birthright Israel filed a "cease and desist" complaint against Birthright Unplugged for trademark infringement, alleging "unfair competition".
