= Into the Widening World =

1995 short story collection

- First edition cover
- Editor: John Loughery
- Publisher: Persea Books
- Publication date: 6 January 1995
- ISBN: 978-0-89255-204-7

Into the Widening World: International Coming-Of-Age Stories is a 1995 collection of 26 short fictional coming-of-age stories. Edited by John Loughery and published by Persea Books, it includes stories from numerous authors, including Nadine Gordimer, Ben Okri, Bharati Mukherjee, Alice Munro and Gabriel García Márquez.

== Stories ==
=== South America and the Caribbean ===
- "Columba" by Michelle Cliff (Jamaica)
- "Weight-Reducing Diet" by Jorge Edwards (Chile)
- "On Sunday" by Mario Vargas (Argentina)
- "Artificial Roses" by Gabriel García Márquez (Colombia)
- "The Raffle" by V. S. Naipaul (Trinidad)

=== North America ===
- "Exchange Value" by Charles Johnson (United States)
- "Borders" by Thomas King (Canada)
- "Saints" by Bharati Mukherjee (United States)
- "The Turkey Season" by Alice Munro (Canada)

=== Europe and Russia ===
- "The Gifts of War" by Margaret Drabble (Great Britain)
- "The Nothingness Forest" by Margareta Ekstrom (Sweden)
- "Christmas" by John McGahern (Ireland)
- "That Wall, That Mimosa" by Merce Rodoreda (Catalonia/Spain)
- "Date with a bird" by Tatyana Tolstaaya (Russia)

=== Africa and the Middle East ===
- "Turkish Soldier from Edirne" by Nissim Aloni (Israel)
- "Some Are Born to Sweet Delight" by Nadine Gordimer (South Africa)
- "The Conjurer Made Off with the Dish" by Naguib Mahfouz (Egypt)
- "Who Will Stop the Dark?" by Charles Mungoshi (Zimbabwe)
- "In the Shadow of War" by Ben Okri (Nigeria)
- "When the Train Comes" by Zoe Wicomb (South Africa)

=== Asia and the South Pacific ===
- "American Dreams" by Peter Carey (Australia)
- "In Broad Daylight" by Ha Jin (China)
- "Mr. Tang's Girls" by Shirley Geok-lin Lim (Malaysia)
- "Martyrdom" by Yukio Mishima (Japan)
- "One Sunday" by Rohinton Mistry (India)
- "Babaru, the Family" by B. Wongar (Australia)

== Publication history ==
- Loughery, John, ed. (1995). Into the Widening World: International Coming-of-Age Stories. New York: Persea Books. ISBN 0-89255-204-2.

== Reception ==
Into the Widening World was well received by critics. According to Kirkus Reviews, the "collection is not just diverse: It's also good". They highlighted how "nearly all the voices are strong and distinct, resulting in an anthology that, taken as a whole, negotiates themes of universality and difference with unusual intelligence and imagination". Publishers Weekly described the collection as a "heartfelt anthology of brilliant voices", though noted that Loughery's introduction was "sometimes overburdened". They highlighted Zoë Wicomb's "unforgettable narrator" in her short story, "When the Train Comes", as well as Margareta Ekström's "The Nothingness Forest", Mario Vargas Llosa's "On Sunday", and Naguib Mahfouz's "The Conjurer Made Off with the Dish".

Booklist also reviewed the collection.
