= Chris Fuhrman =

American novelist

Chris Fuhrman (1960–1991) was an American novelist, author of The Dangerous Lives of Altar Boys.

Fuhrman was born in Savannah, Georgia in 1960. He received his Masters from Columbia University.

== Novel ==
The Dangerous Lives of Altar Boys, set in Savannah, Georgia in the early 1970s, centers on Francis Doyle, Tim Sullivan, and their three closest friends, altar boys at Blessed Sacrament and eighth grade classmates at the parish school.

Fuhrman died of cancer in 1991 while working on the final revision of The Dangerous Lives of Altar Boys, his only novel.

Portions of the novel were first published by Columbia: A Journal of Literature and Art in 1991. The University of Georgia Press published the work in 1994, to very positive reviews.

== Film adaptation ==
A film adaptation, The Dangerous Lives of Altar Boys, was released in 2002. It was directed by Peter Care, dedicated to Fuhrman, and starred Emile Hirsch, Kieran Culkin, Jena Malone, Jodie Foster, and Vincent D'Onofrio.

== Bibliography ==
- The Dangerous Lives of Altar Boys – University of Georgia Press, 1994, ISBN 0-8203-1632-6
