= Perfect Tides =

2022 video game

- Developer: Three Bees
- Publisher: Three Bees
- Engine: Adventure Game Studio
- Platform: PC
- Release: February 21, 2022
- Genre: Point-and-click adventure game

Perfect Tides is a 2022 point-and-click adventure game developed by Three Bees, the development studio of cartoonist Meredith Gran. The game is set in the year 2000 and follows Mara Whitefish, an adolescent girl living on an island town off the United States east coast.

Perfect Tides originated as a crowdfunding campaign in 2018. After its 2022 release, it received positive reviews and appeared on multiple "best of" lists for the year. Daniel Kobylarz composed the soundtrack.

A sequel, Perfect Tides: Station to Station, released on January 22, 2026.

== Synopsis ==
Mara Whitefish is a young teenage girl who lives with her mother and brother on an island community called Perfect Tides. She feels increasingly distant from her family and friends in the wake of her father's death. She seeks comfort in online forums and fanfiction communities—in particular, from a boy who goes by the username STaggle.

== Gameplay ==
Perfect Tides is a 2D point-and-click adventure game. The player talks to characters and uses inventory items to complete tasks, solve puzzles, and advance the story.

== Development ==
Developer Three Bees is based in Philadelphia. Gran launched a Kickstarter campaign on January 29, 2018 and developed the game in Adventure Game Studio, a free-to-use engine specialized for 2D adventure games. Perfect Tides was Gran's first video game—she was previously a cartoonist known for the comic Octopus Pie. She stated that her previous experience was useful when transitioning to game design, and she looked to earlier point-and-click adventure games for inspiration such as King's Quest VII and The Dig.

== Reception ==
Perfect Tides received positive reviews. Critics applauded its writing, humor, and artwork, as well as its portrayal of its protagonist Mara. A Polygon review said the game effectively navigated both complex emotions and lighthearted comedy, and Kotaku called the game an "incredible" portrait of adolescence. The game would go on to appear on multiple "best of" lists for 2022.
