= Sylvia Rimm =

American psychologist

Sylvia Barkan Rimm Born on April 16, 1935 is an American psychologist specializing in parenting, child development and learning. She has written books on raising gifted children, success for girls, and communication skills.

Rimm has a PhD. from the University of Wisconsin–Madison. She has been a clinical professor of psychiatry and pediatrics at Case Western Reserve University School of Medicine. She received her psychology license from the Ohio State Board of Psychology on March 12, 1993.

== Books ==
- Exploring Feelings: Discussion Book for Gifted Kids Have Feelings Too
- Why Bright Kids Get Poor Grades: And What You Can Do About It
- How to Parent So Children Will Learn
- Education of the Gifted and Talented
- Keys to Parenting the Gifted Child
- Underachievement Syndrome: Causes and Cures
- See Jane Win
- See Jane Win for Girls: A Smart Girl's Guide to Success
- How Jane Won
- Gifted Kids Have Feelings Too
- Raising Preschoolers
- Sylvia Rimm on Raising Kids
- Rescuing the Emotional Lives of Overweight Children
- Growing Up Too Fast
- Jane Wins Again
