= Sibling abuse =

Physical, emotional, and/or sexual abuse of one sibling by another

Sibling abuse includes the physical, psychological, or sexual abuse of one sibling by another. As opposed to sibling rivalry, sibling abuse is characterized by the use of control or power by one sibling over another.

A power differential is not always easily identifiable, so an additionally important characteristic of sibling abuse is that the incidents or patterns of behaviors between siblings pose a high risk of serious physical and/or emotional harm and may include sexual coercion or violence. Sibling sexual abuse includes sexual behaviors that are unwanted, pressured, coerced, and may include contact or non-contact behaviors. Physical, psychological, and sexual abuse can often co-occur.

More often than not, the younger sibling is abused by the older sibling. Sibling abuse often goes unrecognized, even by those harmed by it. Sibling abuse is the most common form of family violence in the US. Nationally-representative data collected in 2013 reported that about a third of US children, aged 0–17 years of age, had been victimized by their sibling. Sibling sexual abuse has been estimated to occur for between 1-7% of siblings.

== Physical abuse ==
Sibling physical abuse can include shoving, hitting, slapping, kicking, biting, pinching, scratching, and hair-pulling. Sibling physical abuse is more common than peer bullying and other forms of family abuse, such as spousal or child abuse.

Even when sibling abuse is recognized it remains under-reported, due to the lack of recognition and resources provided to families, such as child protective services and mandatory reporters.

Sibling physical abuse can persist from being a child and being an adult, with prevalence rates varying across studies, though its frequency declines as the victim and/or sibling who harms age.

In Pakistani immigrant families in the UK, siblings have been reported to hold the highest proportion of physical abuse compared to other family members, with 35% committed by siblings, compared to 33% by mothers and 19% by fathers.

The findings for gender differences in sibling physical victimization experiences are mixed, but generally show that boys are more likely to be victimized than are girls. Additionally, age and birth order are also contributing factors to sibling abuse, where older siblings are more likely to abuse younger siblings.

== Psychological abuse ==
Psychological abuse among siblings can be difficult to identify. Psychological abuse can include ridicule to express contempt, as well as degradation towards the other's self-esteem. Abusive psychological harm may involve extreme threats of harm or intimidation. Hence, the consequences of the aggression are not only injury, but also control or domination of one sibling over the other. According to a Whipple and Finton report released in 1995, "psychological maltreatment between siblings is one of the most common, yet often under-recognized forms of child abuse." Being victimized by a sibling in childhood and adolescence causes fear.

== Sexual abuse ==
Sexual sibling abuse is defined as sexual behavior "that is not age appropriate, not transitory, and not motivated by developmentally appropriate curiosity." To identify sexual abuse, there needs to be coercion and domination over one sibling, although the power differential between siblings can sometimes be subtle and hard to discern, especially when siblings are close in age. Prevalence rates have been described as difficult to calculate for several reasons: victims often do not realize that they are suffering abuse, until they reach maturity and have a better understanding of the role they played during the encounters, they are afraid of reporting, and there is no consensus on a definition of sibling sexual abuse. A nationally representative survey of adults in Australia found that 2% had experienced sibling sexual abuse in childhood.

As with other forms of abuse among siblings, there is a lack of reporting in sibling sexual abuse, as parents either do not recognize it as being abuse or try to cover-up the abuse. An increased risk of sibling sexual abuse may be found in a heightened sexual climate in a family, or in a rigidly, sexually repressed family environments. Sexual abuse in siblings may have long-term effects on the victims. Many victims have been diagnosed with a variety of psychological problems. Victims have been reported to correlate pain and fear with sex, leading to long-term issues with intimacy.

Rudd and Herzberger report that brothers who committed incest were more likely to use force than fathers who commit incest (64% vs. 53%). Similarly, Cyr and colleagues found that about 70% of sibling incest involved sexual penetration, substantially higher than other forms of incest. Rayment and Owen report that "[in comparison of] the offending patterns of sibling offenders with other teenage sex offenders ... Sibling abusers admitted to more sexual offenses, had a higher recidivism rate, and a majority engaged in more intrusive sexual behavior than other adolescent sex offenders. The sibling perpetrator has more access to the victim and exists within a structure of silence and guilt." Research has also shown that compared to adolescents who sexually harm non-siblings, adolescents who sexually harm siblings have experienced more adverse childhood experiences and are more likely to have a history of being sexually abused themselves.

== Identification ==
Common parental reactions include minimization of the harmful impact of sibling aggression, expression of disbelief, or making of excuses for the behaviors. Many professionals, such as those in child protective services, law enforcement, school counselors, pediatricians, and nurses, may not know that sibling aggression and abuse happen, are not trained to ask about it, and do not have knowledge of how to respond. Screening questions about types of aggression, frequency, the intention of harm, the magnitude of the aggression, and unidirectional dominance help assess the existence of abuse.

Family violence researcher Vernon Weihe developed four criteria that is used to determine if questionable behavior is rivalry or abusive. First, one must determine if the questionable behavior is age-appropriate, since children use different conflict resolution tactics at various developmental stages. Second, one must determine if the behavior is an isolated incident or part of an enduring pattern: abuse is, by definition, a long-term pattern rather than occasional disagreements. Third, one must determine if there is an "aspect of victimization" to the behavior: rivalry tends to be incident-specific, reciprocal, and obvious to others, while abuse is characterized by secrecy and an imbalance of power. Fourth, one must determine the goal of the questionable behavior: the goal of abuse tends to be embarrassment or domination of the victim.

A challenge to identifying sibling sexual abuse is differentiating between sexual abuse and developmentally appropriate sexual behavior. A victim may not be aware that they did not consent because of innocence or lack of understanding of what was happening. The latter generally happens to children who are too young to understand sexual implications and boundaries.

== Risk factors ==
There are several important risk factors associated with sibling abuse. They can be categorized into family system, parenting behavior, individual, and other risk factors.

=== Family system ===
This category of risk factors associated with sibling abuse looks at the family system as a whole. It includes negative and conflictual parent-child relationships, parental hostility toward a child, spousal abuse, partner conflict, marital conflict, financial stress, low family cohesion, family disorganization and household chaos, parental alcoholism, parental support of child aggression, low maternal education, family adversity, and family triangulation.

=== Parenting behavior ===
This category of risk factors associated with sibling abuse examines the parenting behavior of adult caregivers. It includes parental differential treatment of children, parents ratings such as "bad or good" and "easy or difficult" to their children, low parental involvement, ineffective parenting, inconsistent discipline, coercive parenting, parental abuse or neglect of children, approval of aggression, corporal punishment, insufficient supervision, not intervening in sibling conflict, and not acknowledging child-voiced claims of maltreatment.

=== Individual ===
This category of risk factors associated with sibling abuse considers individual traits of the harming child and the victim child. For children who harm their siblings, known individual risk factors include lack of empathy for victims, unmet personal needs for physical contact in emotion-deprived environments, experience of victimization inside or outside of the family, and sibling parentification.

Children harmed by siblings, children with autism or physical disabilities are at a greater risk of being victimized by their sibling than are typically developing children. Siblings who are LGBTQ are at risk for sibling victimization.

== Potential effects ==
The effects of sibling abuse closely parallel those of other forms of child abuse. Researchers have consistently demonstrated that harming a sibling or being victimized by one is associated with negative impacts on mental and physical health across the lifespan. Sibling aggression and abusive behaviors are associated with depression, anxiety, and low self-esteem in childhood and adulthood. Research conducted by Wiehe has posited that there may be significant problems following sibling abuse such as affect regulation and accompanying mood disorders, impulse control, somatization, post-traumatic stress disorder, eating disorders, substance abuse, major depression, and communication deficits. Sibling abuse has also been associated with behaviorial difficulties, such as aggression and delinquency.

Two studies conducted in the United States have indicated that sibling aggression sets the stage for peer aggression. 15% of children and adolescents victimized at home by a sibling are also victimized at school by peers. A school bully may be harmed by a sibling at home. It also sets the stage for dating violence.

In addition to the general physical and psychological impacts of sibling abuse, potential consequences of sibling sexual abuse include: difficulty separating pleasure from pain or fear from desire in intimate relationships, re-victimization in adulthood, difficulty developing and sustaining relationships, trouble negotiating boundaries, and codependency in relationships.

Siblicide may be an effect of sibling abuse in which a sibling commits homicide against another sibling; typically seen as a male sibling entering life as an adult against a younger brother.

In 2005, psychologists John V. Caffaro and Allison Conn-Caffaro released a study detailing and analysing treatment for sibling abuse among adult family groups. The data published displayed significantly higher rates of emotional cutoff (34%) with brothers and sisters than what is evident in the general population (<6%).

== Media portrayals ==
An important plot point within the traditional fairy tale of Cinderella is the eponymous main character's cruel treatment at the hands of her stepsisters with their mother's implicit approval.

The 1991 made-for-TV movie My Son, Johnny is a fictionalized portrayal of sibling abuse. The film stars Corin Nemec as a teenager victimized by his older brother, played by Rick Schroder. The film was inspired by the real-life case of Philadelphia fifteen-year-old Michael Lombardo, tried and acquitted for the 1985 killing of his nineteen-year-old brother, Francis "Frankie" Lombardo, who had battered and abused him for years.

The British drama Hollyoaks ran a storyline in 2024 featuring sibling sexual abuse between twins Jack Junior (JJ) and Frankie Osborne. The portrayal highlighted family dynamics of parental favoritism of JJ, the “golden boy”, and the abuse’s negative impacts on Frankie, who began binge drinking and self-harming. The Hollyoaks production team consulted with experts from sexual assault response advocates, also known as SARAs, to ensure a realistic portrayal of sibling sexual abuse.

== Notable examples ==
The 2013 documentary Sibling Rivalry: Near, Dear and Dangerous highlighted the aggressive and abusive sibling relationships of several notable figures, including actresses Olivia de Havilland and Joan Fontaine.
