= Sibling =

One of two or more individuals having at least one parent in common

A sibling is a relative that shares at least one parent with the other person. A male sibling is a brother, and a female sibling is a sister. A person with no siblings is an only child.

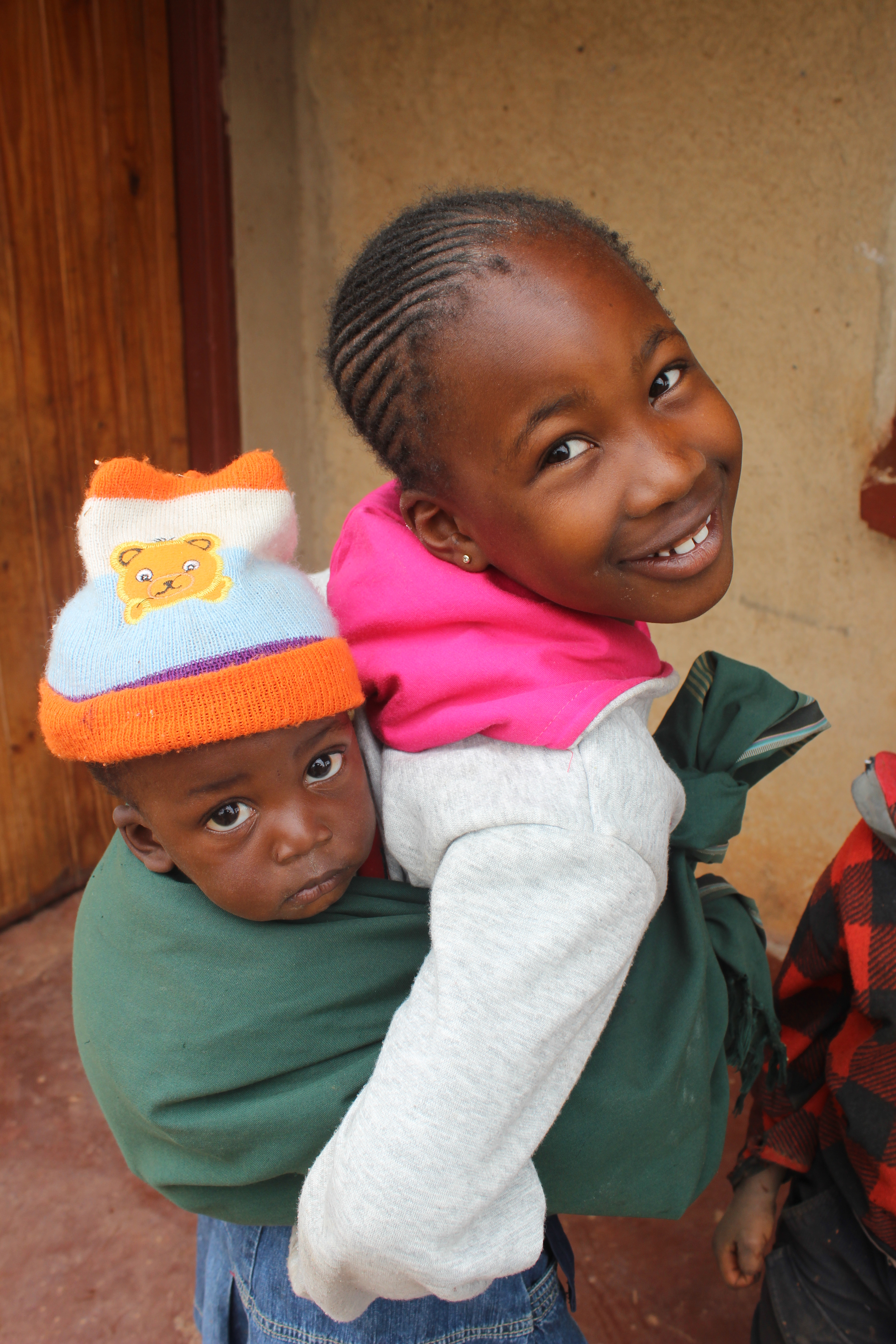
A sister (female sibling) carrying her brother (male sibling).

While some circumstances can cause siblings to be raised separately (such as foster care or adoption), most societies have siblings grow up together. This causes the development of strong emotional bonds, with siblinghood considered a unique type of relationship. The emotional bond between siblings is often complicated and is influenced by factors such as parental treatment, birth order, personality, and personal experiences outside the family.

Medically, a full-sibling is a first-degree relative and a half-sibling is a second-degree relative as they are related by 50% and 25%, respectively.

== Definitions ==
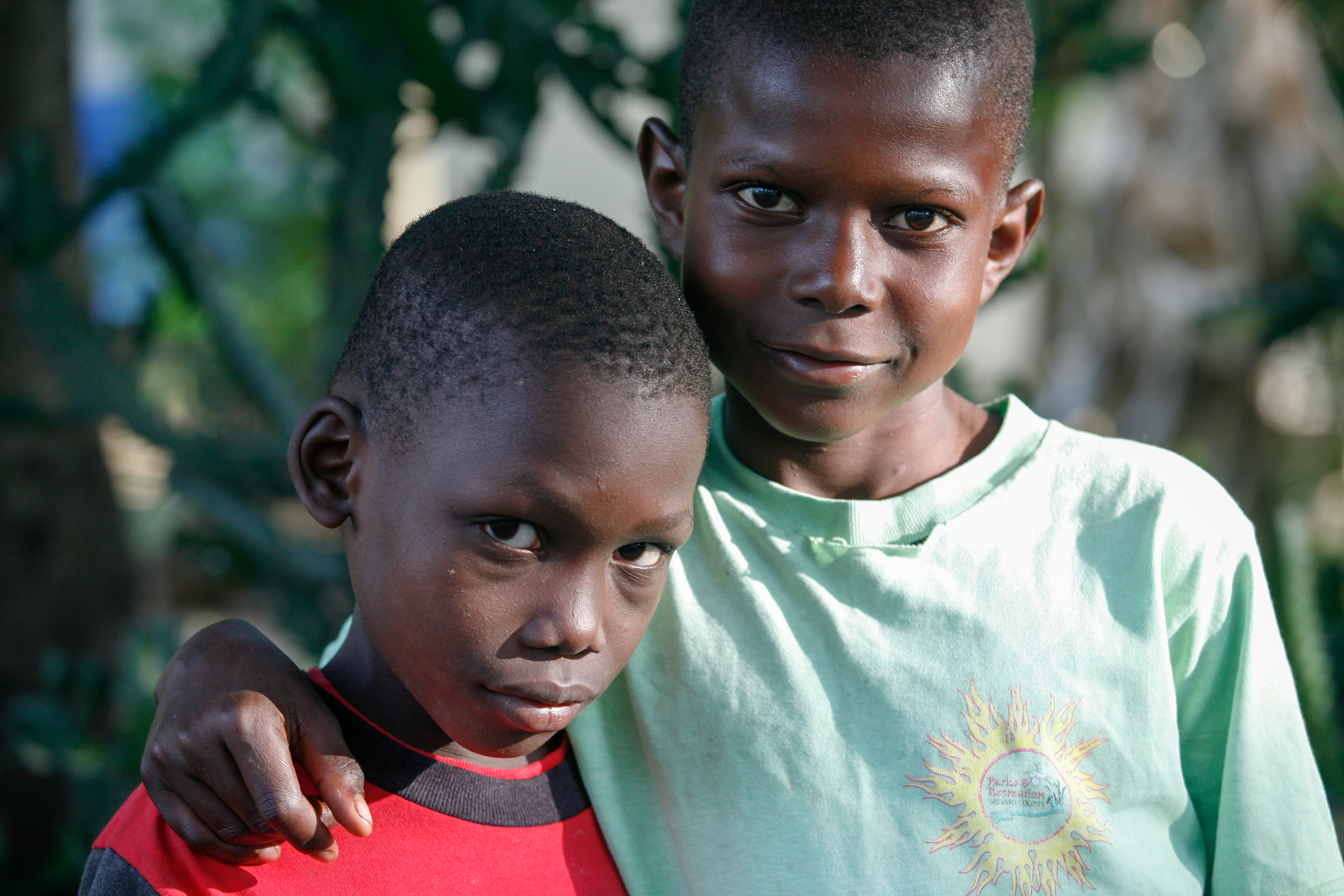
Two brothers from Haiti.

The word sibling was reintroduced in 1903 in an article in Biometrika, as a translation for the German Geschwister, having not been used since Middle English, specifically 1425.

Siblings or full-siblings ([full] sisters or brothers) share the same biological parents. Full-siblings are also the most common type of siblings. Twins are siblings that are born from the same pregnancy. Twins generally share a greater bond due to growing up together and being the same age.

Half-siblings (half-sisters or half-brothers) are people who share one parent. They may share the same mother but different fathers (in which case they are known as uterine siblings or maternal half-siblings), or they may have the same father but different mothers (in which case, they are known as agnate siblings or paternal half-siblings. In law, the term consanguine is used in place of agnate). In law (and especially inheritance law), half-siblings have often been accorded treatment unequal to that of full-siblings. Old English common law at one time incorporated inequalities into the laws of intestate succession, with half-siblings taking only half as much property of their intestate siblings' estates as siblings of full-blood. Unequal treatment of this type has been wholly abolished in England, but still exists in Florida.

Three-quarter siblings share one parent, while the unshared parents are first-degree relatives to each other, for example, if a man has children with two women who are sisters, or a woman has children with a man and his son. In the first case, the children are half-siblings as well as first cousins; in the second, the children are half-siblings as well as a half-avuncular pair. They are genetically closer than half-siblings but less genetically close than full-siblings, a degree of genetic relationship that is rare in humans and little-studied. One notable example of three-quarter siblings is the family of American aviator Charles Lindbergh, who fathered children with two German sisters, Brigitte and Marietta Hesshaimer.

Diblings, a portmanteau of donor sibling, or donor-conceived sibling, or donor-sperm sibling, are biologically connected through donated eggs or sperm. Diblings are biologically siblings though not legally for the purposes of family rights and inheritance. The anonymity of donation is seen to add complication to the process of courtship.

=== Non-blood relations ===
Related through affinity:

- Stepsiblings (stepbrothers or stepsisters) are the children of one's stepparent from a previous relationship.
- Adoptive siblings are raised by a person who is the adoptive parent of one and the adoptive or biological parent of the other.
- Siblings-in-law are the siblings of one's spouse, the spouse of one's sibling, or the spouse of one's spouse's sibling. The spouse of one's spouse's sibling may also be called a co-sibling.

Not related:

- Foster siblings are children who are raised in the same foster home: foster children of one's parent(s), or the children or foster children of one's foster parent.
- God siblings are the children of the godfather or godmother or the godchildren of the father or mother.
- Milk siblings are children who have been nursed by the same woman. This relationship exists in cultures with milk kinship and in Islamic law.
- Cross-siblings are individuals who share one or more half-siblings; if one person has at least one maternal half-sibling and at least one paternal half-sibling, the maternal and paternal half-siblings are cross-siblings to each other.

Siblings and half-siblings

Adam	Agatha	Anthony
Bryan	Betty	Cyrus

Bryan and Betty are full siblings while Cyrus is their half brother; their relation percentage of consanguinity is 50%.

Siblings, half-siblings, and three-quarter siblings

Alice	Anthony
Bert	Corina	Bobby	Edwina
Donna	David	Emily	Frank

Donna and David are full siblings.
Emily is their three-quarter sibling and Frank's half sister.

Siblings, half siblings, three-quarter siblings, and cross siblings

Egres
Erika

Abiga	Abal
Efram	Venia	Abram	Aserna	Zak	Agnia
Jrake	Jaden	Julia	Janine

Belina
Bein	Magnolea
Jakob

Erika and Efram are full siblings; to them, Abram, Aserna, and Agnia are their half-siblings, and Bein is their cross sibling.
Julia and Janine were born to one father and two full-sibling mothers, and are thus three-quarter siblings. Jaden is their cousin, while Jrake and Jakob are their half-cousins.
Jrake and Jaden were born to one mother and two half-sibling fathers, and are thus three-quarter siblings, however, their actual percentage of genetic relation is 31.25% instead of 37.5%.
Jrake and Jakob are unrelated to each other, although they are both half-cousins of Julia and Janine.

== Consanguinity and genetics ==
Consanguinity is the measure of how closely people are related. Genetic relatedness measures how many genes a person shares. As all humans share over 99% of the same genes, consanguinity only matters for the small fraction of genes which vary between different people. Inheritance of genes has a random element to it, and these two concepts are different. Consanguinity decreases by half for every generation of reproductive separation through their most recent common ancestor. Siblings are 50% related by consanguinity as they are separated from each other by two generation (sibling to parent to sibling), and they share two parents as common ancestors ($\left ( \tfrac{1}{2} \right )^2 + \left ( \tfrac{1}{2} \right )^2$).

A fraternal twin is a sibling and, therefore, is related by 50% consanguinity. Fraternal twins are no more genetically similar than regular siblings. As identical twins come from the same zygote, their most recent common ancestor is each other. They’re genetically identical and 100% consanguineous as they’re separated by zero generations ($\left ( \tfrac{1}{2} \right )^0$). Twin studies have been conducted by scientists to examine the roles that genetics and environment play in the development of various traits. Such studies examine how often identical twins possess the same behavioral trait and compare it to how often fraternal twins possess the same trait. In other studies twins are raised in separate families, and studies compare the passing on of a behavioral trait by the family environment and the possession of a common trait between identical twins. This kind of study has revealed that for personality traits which are known to be heritable, genetics play a substantial role throughout life and an even larger role during early years.

Half-siblings are 25% related by consanguinity as they share one parent and separated from each other by two generations ($\left ( \tfrac{1}{2} \right )^2$).

A person may share more than the standard consanguinity with their sibling if their parents are closely biologically related (the coefficient of inbreeding is greater than zero). Interestingly, half-siblings can be related by as "three-quarters siblings" (related by 3/8) if their unshared parents have a consanguinity of 50%. This means the unshared parents are either siblings, making the half-siblings cousins, or parent and child, making them half- aunt-uncle and niece-nephew.

=== Percentage distribution ===
In practice, full siblings do not share exactly 50% of their DNA, as chromosomal crossover only occurs a limited number of times and, therefore, large chunks of a chromosome are shared or not shared at one time. In fact, the mean DNA fraction shared is 50.28% with a standard deviation of 3.68%, meaning approximately 1/4 of sibling pairs share more than 52.76% of their DNA, while 1/4 share less than 47.8%.

There is a very small chance that two half-siblings might not share any genes if they didn't inherit any of the same chromosomes from their shared parent. This is possible for full-siblings as well, though even more unlikely. But because of how homologous chromosomes swap genes (due to chromosomal crossover during meiosis) during the development of an egg or sperm cell, however, the odds of this ever actually occurring are practically non-existent.

== Birth order ==
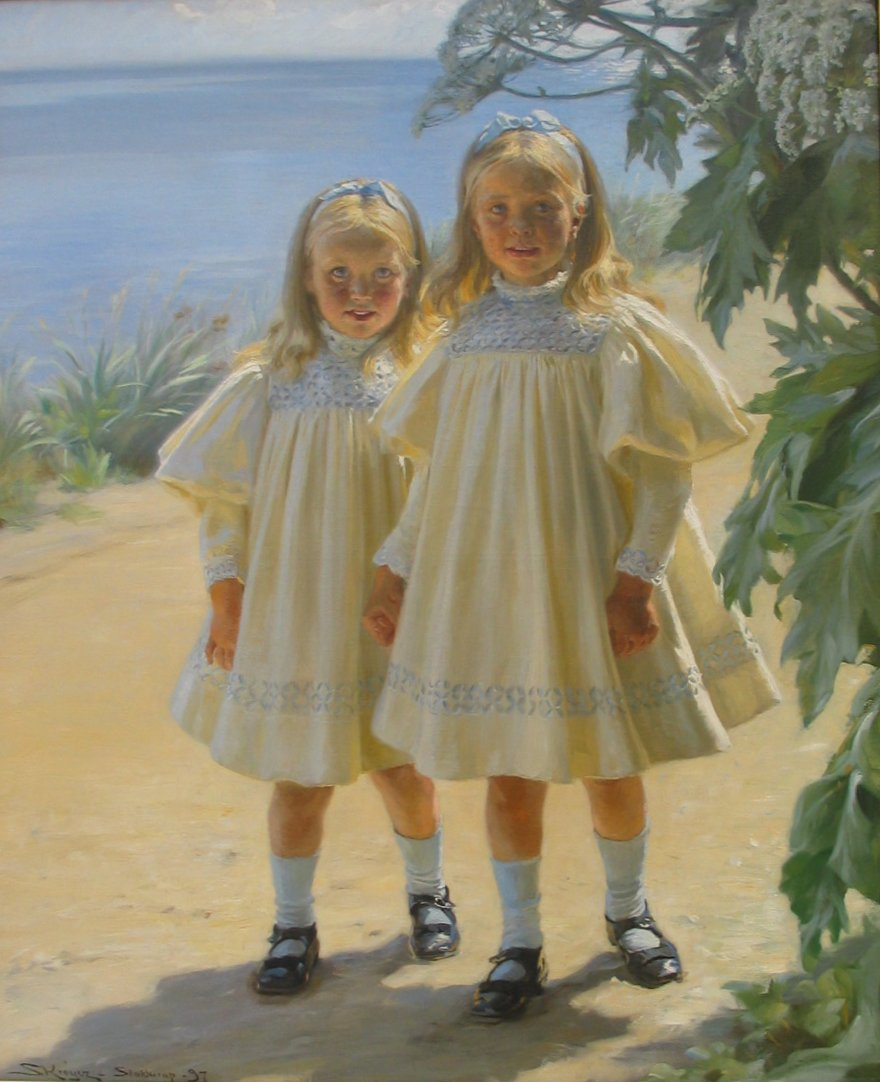
The Benzon Daughters by Peder Severin Krøyer

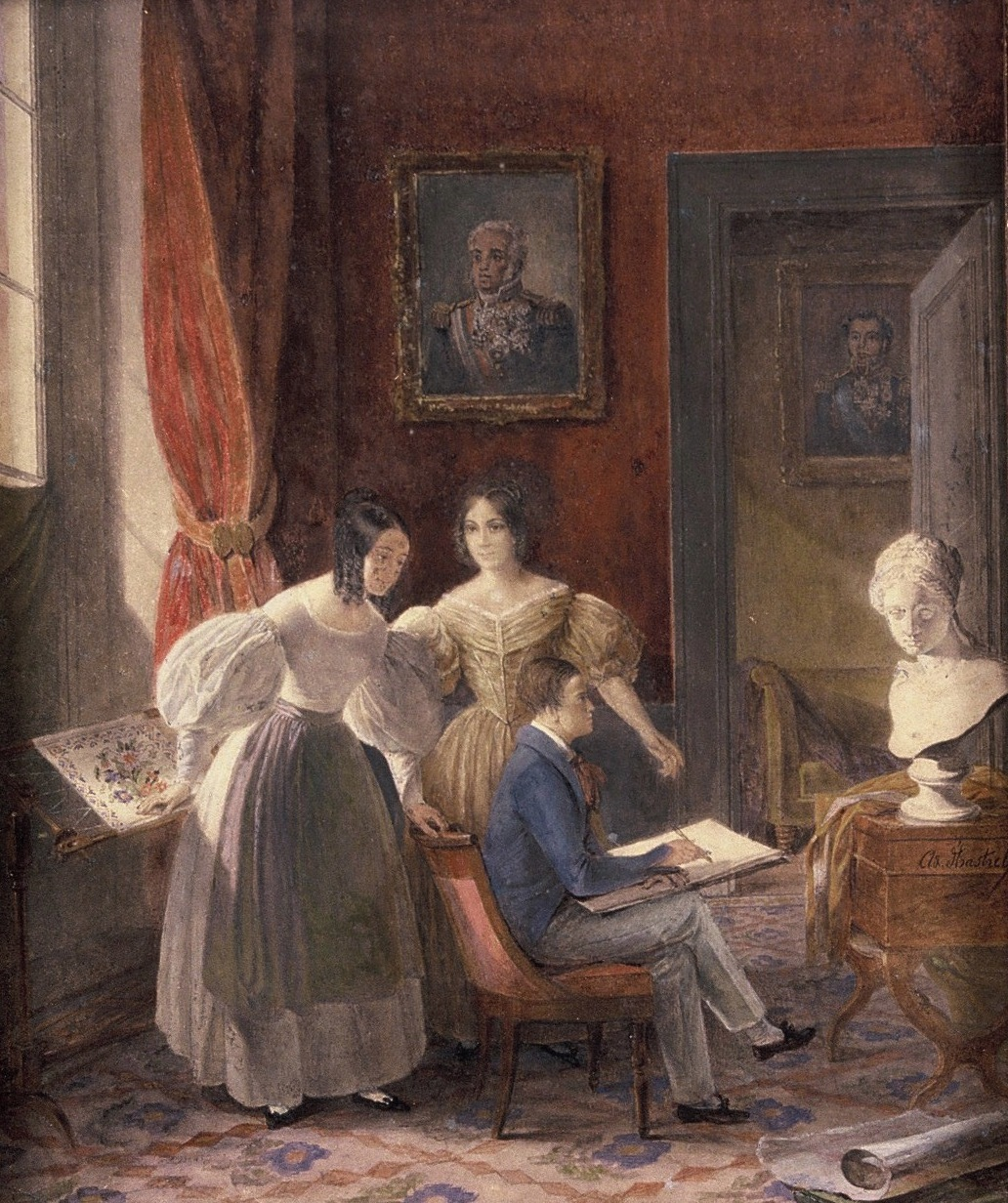
14-year-old Emperor Pedro II of Brazil with his older sisters, Princesses Francisca and Januária. Painting by Adolphe Hastrel de Rivedoux, 1839

Birth order is a person's rank by age among their siblings. Typically, researchers classify siblings as "eldest", "middle child", and "youngest" or simply distinguish between "first-born" and "later-born" children.

Birth order is commonly believed in pop psychology and popular culture to have a profound and lasting effect on psychological development and personality. For example, firstborns are seen as conservative and high-achieving, middle children as natural mediators, and youngest children as charming and outgoing. Despite its lasting presence in the public domain, studies have failed to consistently produce clear, valid, compelling findings; therefore, it has earned the title of a pseudo-psychology amongst the scientific psychological community.

=== History ===
The theorizing and study of birth order can be traced back to Francis Galton's (1822–1911) theory of birth order and eminence and Alfred Adler's (1870–1937) theory of birth order and personality characteristics.

==== Galton ====
In his book English Men of Science: Their Nature and Nurture (1874), Galton noted that prominent composers and scientists are over-represented as first-borns. He theorized three main reasons as to why first-borns are generally more eminent:

1. Primogeniture laws: first-borns have access to their parents' financial resources to continue their education.
2. First-borns are given more responsibility than their younger siblings and are treated more as companions by their parents.
3. First-borns are given more attention and nourishment in families with limited financial resources.

==== Adler ====
- First Borns: Fulfilling family roles of leadership and authority, obedient of protocol and hierarchy. Seek out and prefer order, structure and adherence to norms and rules. They partake in goal-striving behaviour as their lives are centred around achievement and accomplishment themes. They fear the loss of their position in the top of the hierarchy.
- Middle Children: Feel like outcasts of families as they lack primacy of the first child and the "attention garnering recency" of the youngest. These children often go to great lengths to de-identify themselves with their siblings, in an attempt to make a different and individualized identity for themselves as they feel like they were "squeezed out" of their families.
- Youngest Children: Feel disadvantaged compared to older siblings, are often perceived as less capable or experienced and are therefore indulged and spoiled. Because of this, they are skilled in coaxing/charming others to do things for them or provide. This contributes to the image of them being popular and outgoing, as they engage in attention-seeking behaviour to meet their needs.

=== Contemporary findings ===
The flaws and inconsistencies in birth order research eliminate its validity. It is very difficult to control solely for factors related to birth order, and therefore most studies produce ambiguous results. Embedded into theories of birth order is a debate of nature versus nurture. It has been disproved that there is something innate in the position one is born into, and therefore creating a preset role. Birth order has no genetic basis.

The social interaction that occurs as a result of birth order however is the most notable. Older siblings often become role models of behaviour, and younger siblings become learners and supervisees. Older siblings are at a developmental advantage both cognitively and socially. The role of birth order also depends greatly and varies greatly on family context. Family size, sibling identification, age gap, modeling, parenting techniques, gender, class, race, and temperament are all confounding variables that can influence behaviour and therefore perceived behaviour of specific birth categories. The research on birth order does have stronger correlations, however, in areas such as intelligence and physical features, but are likely caused by other factors other than the actual position of birth. Some research has found that firstborn children have slightly higher IQs on average than later born children. However, other research finds no such effect. It has been found that first-borns score three points higher compared to second borns and that children born earlier in a family are on average, taller and weigh more than those born later. However, it is impossible to generalize birth order characteristics and apply them universally to all individuals in that subgroup.

==== Contemporary explanations for IQ findings ====
===== Resource dilution model =====
(Blake, 1981) provide three potential reasons for the higher scoring of older siblings on IQ tests:

1. Parental resources are finite, first-born children get full and primary access to these resources.
2. As the number of a children in a family goes up, the more resources must be shared.
3. These parental resources have an important impact on a child's educational success.

===== Confluence model =====
Robert Zajonc proposed that the intellectual environment within a family is ever-changing due to three factors, and therefore more permissive of first-born children's intellectual advancement:

1. Firstborns do not need to share parental attention and have their parents' complete absorption. More siblings in the family limit the attention devoted to each of them.
2. Firstborns are exposed to more adult language. Later-borns are exposed to the less-mature speech of their older siblings.
3. Firstborns and older siblings must answer questions and explain things to younger siblings, acting as tutors. This advances their cognitive processing of information and language skills.

In 1996, interest in the science behind birth order was re-sparked when Frank Sulloway’s book Born To Rebel was published. In this book, Sulloway argues that firstborns are more conscientious, more socially dominant, less agreeable, and less open to new ideas compared to later-borns. While being seemingly empirical and academic, as many studies are cited throughout the book, it is still often criticized as a biased and incomplete account of the whole picture of siblings and birth order. Because it is a novel, the research and theories proposed throughout were not criticized and peer-reviewed by other academics before its release. Literature reviews that have examined many studies and attempted to control for confounding variables tend to find minimal effects for birth order on personality. In her review of the scientific literature, Judith Rich Harris suggests that birth order effects may exist within the context of the family of origin, but that they are not enduring aspects of personality.

In practice, systematic birth order research is a challenge because it is difficult to control for all of the variables that are statistically related to birth order. For example, large families are generally lower in socioeconomic status than small families, so third-born children are more likely than first-born children to come from poorer families. Spacing of children, parenting style, and gender are additional variables to consider.

== Regressive behavior at birth ==
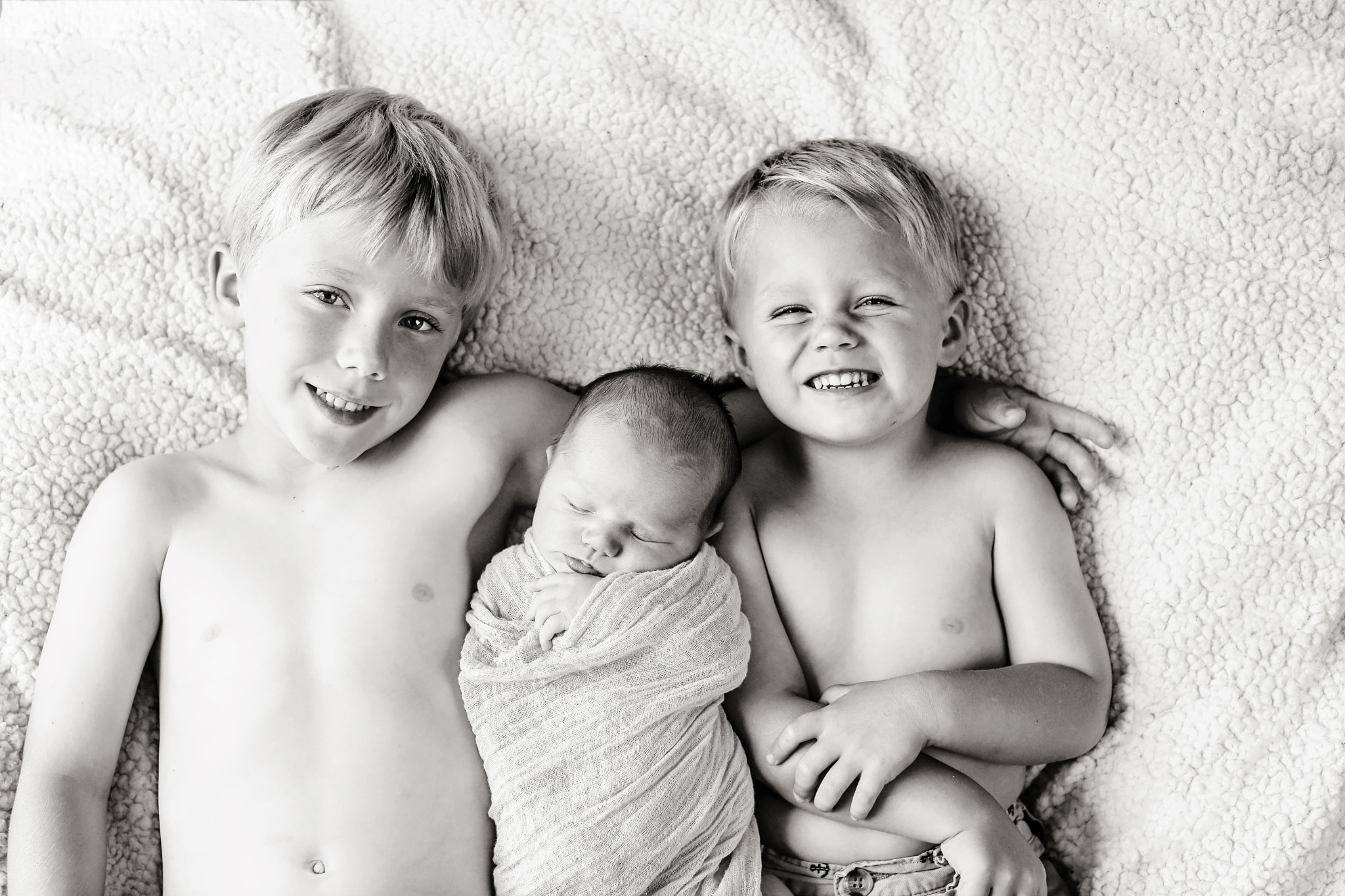
A newborn and his brothers

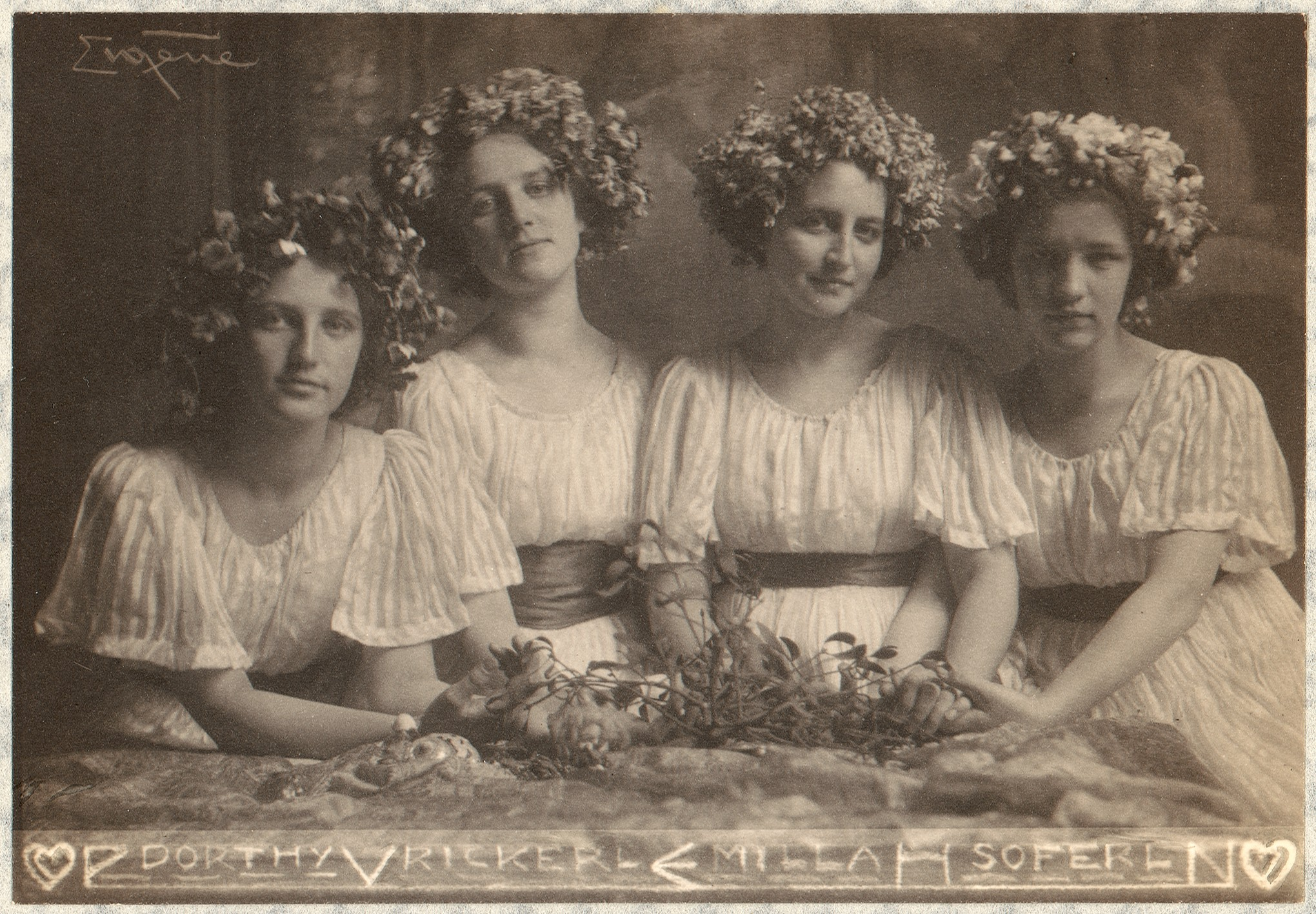
Four Sisters (Frank Eugene, about 1900)

Regressive behaviors are the child's way of demanding the parents' love and attention.

The arrival of a new baby is especially stressful for firstborns and for siblings between 3 and 5 years old. In such situations, regressive behavior may be accompanied by aggressive behavior, such as handling the baby roughly. All of these symptoms are considered to be typical and developmentally appropriate for children between the ages of 3 and 5. While some can be prevented, the remainder can be improved within a few months. Regressive behavior may include demand for a bottle, thumb sucking, requests to wear diapers (even if toilet-trained), or requests to carry a security blanket.

The American Academy of Pediatrics suggests that instead of protesting or telling children to act their age, parents should simply grant their requests without becoming upset. The affected children will soon return to their normal routine when they realize that they now have just as important a place in the family as the new sibling. Most of the behaviors can be improved within a few months.

The University of Michigan Health System advises that most occurrences of regressive behavior are mild and to be expected; however, it recommends parents to contact a pediatrician or child psychologist if the older child tries to hurt the baby, if regressive behavior does not improve within 2 or 3 months, or if the parents have other questions or concerns.

== Rivalry ==
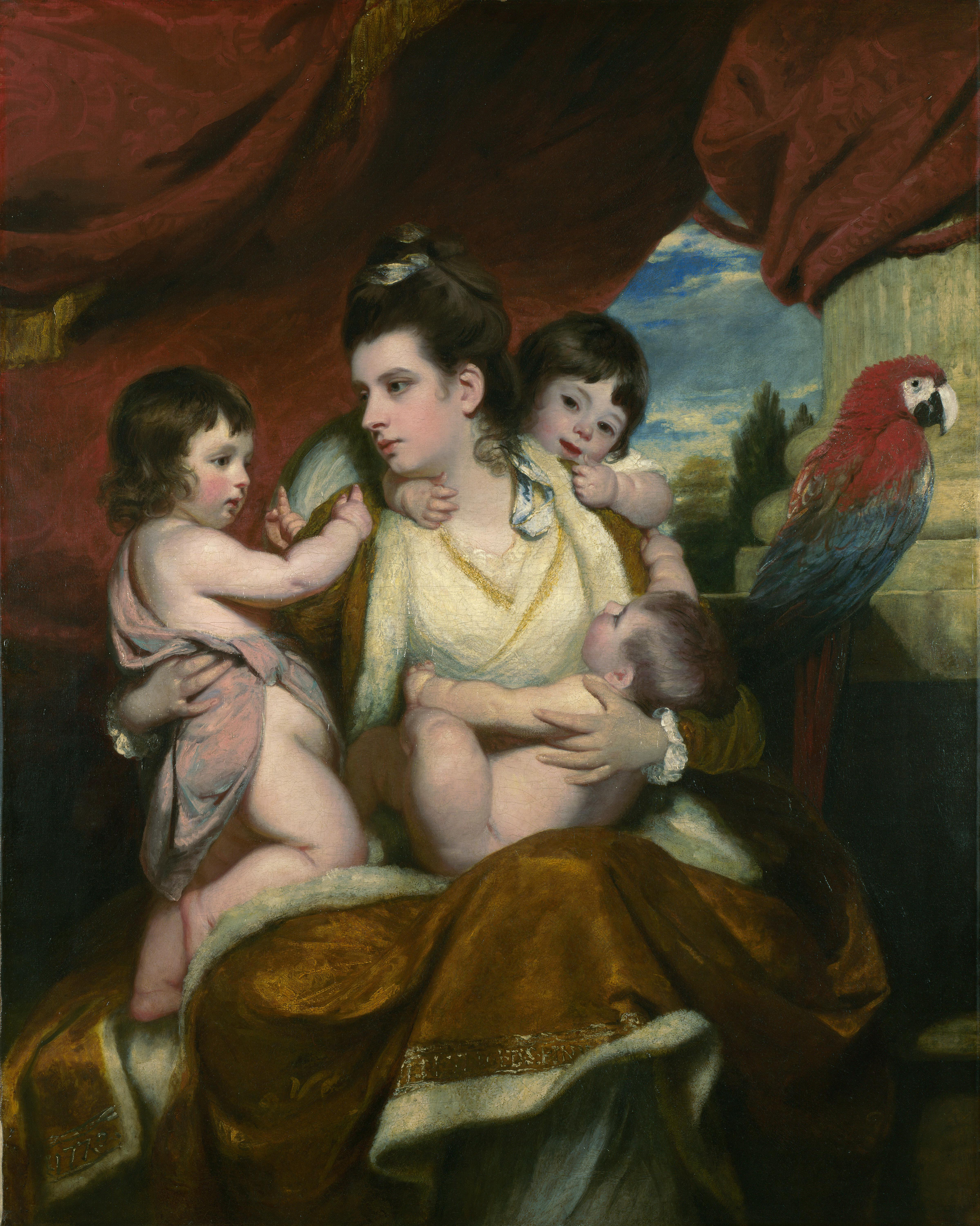
Portrait of Lady Cockburn and her Three Eldest Sons (1773–1775) by Joshua Reynolds

"Sibling rivalry" is a type of competition or animosity among brothers and sisters. It appears to be particularly intense when children are very close in age or of the same gender. Sibling rivalry can involve aggression; however, it is not the same as sibling abuse where one child victimizes another.

Sibling rivalry usually starts right after, or before, the arrival of the second child. While siblings will still love each other, it is not uncommon for them to bicker and be malicious to each other. Children are sensitive from the age of 1 year to differences in parental treatment and by 3 years they have a sophisticated grasp of family rules and can evaluate themselves in relation to their siblings. Sibling rivalry often continues throughout childhood and can be very frustrating and stressful to parents. One study found that the age group 10–15 reported the highest level of competition between siblings. This competition can also cause behavioral spillover where siblings, intentionally or not, influence each other's life trajectories in a positive manner as they attempt to differentiate and challenge themselves to excel, vying for their parents' praise.

Sibling rivalry can continue into adulthood and sibling relationships can change dramatically over the years. Approximately one-third of adults describe their relationship with siblings as rivalrous or distant. However, rivalry often lessens over time and at least 80% of siblings over age 60 enjoy close ties.

Each child in a family competes to define who they are as persons and want to show that they are separate from their siblings. Sibling rivalry increases when children feel they are getting unequal amounts of their parents' attention, where there is stress in the parents' and children's lives, and where fighting is accepted by the family as a way to resolve conflicts. Sigmund Freud saw the sibling relationship as an extension of the Oedipus complex, where brothers were in competition for their mother's attention and sisters for their father's. Evolutionary psychologists explain sibling rivalry in terms of parental investment and kin selection: a parent is inclined to spread resources equally among all children in the family, but a child wants most of the resources for him or herself.

== Relationships ==
=== Jealousy ===
Jealousy is not a single emotion. The basic emotions expressed in jealous interactions are fear, anger, relief, sadness, and anxiety. Jealousy occurs in a social triangle of relationships which do not require a third person. The social triangle involves the relationships between the jealous individual and the parent, the relationship between the parent and the rival, and the relationship between jealous individual and the rival.

==== Newborn ====
First-borns' attachment to their parents is directly related to their jealous behaviour. In a study by Volling, four classes of children were identified based on their different responses of jealousy to new infant siblings and parent interactions.

- Regulated Exploration Children: 60% of children fall into this category. These children closely watch their parents interact with their newborn sibling, approach them positively and sometimes join the interaction. They show fewer behaviour problems in the months following the new birth and do not display problematic behaviours during the parent-infant interaction. These children are considered secure as they act how a child would be expected to act in a familiar home setting with their parents present as secure bases to explore the environment.
- Approach-Avoidant Children: 30% of children fall into this category. These children observe parent-infant interaction closely and are less likely to approach the infant and the parent. They are anxious to explore the new environment as they tend to seek little comfort from their parents.
- Anxious-Clingy Children: 6% of children fell into this category. These children have an intense interest in parent-infant interaction and a strong desire to seek proximity and contact with the parent, and sometimes intrude on parent-child interaction.
- Disruptive Children: 2.7% of children fall into this category. These children are emotionally reactive and aggressive. They have difficulty regulating their negative emotions and may be likely to externalize it as negative behaviour around the newborn.

==== Parental effect ====
Children are more jealous of the interactions between newborns and their mothers than they are with newborns and their fathers. This is logical as up until the birth of the infant, the first-born child had the mother as their primary care-giver all to themselves. Some research has suggested that children display less jealous reactions over father-newborn interactions because fathers tend to punish negative emotion and are less tolerant than mothers of clinginess and visible distress, although this is hard to generalize.

Children that have parents with a better marital relationship are better at regulating their jealous emotions. Children are more likely to express jealousy when their parents are directing their attention to the sibling as opposed to when the parents are solely interacting with them. Parents who are involved in good marital communication help their children cope adaptively with jealousy. They do this by modelling problem-solving and conflict resolution for their children. Children are also less likely to have jealous feelings when they live in a home in which everyone in the family shares and expresses love and happiness.

==== Implicit theories ====
Implicit theories about relationships are associated with the ways children think of strategies to deal with a new situation. Children can fall into two categories of implicit theorizing. They may be malleable theorists and believe that they can affect change on situations and people. Alternatively, they may be fixed theorists, believing situations and people are not changeable. These implicit beliefs determine both the intensity of their jealous feelings, and how long those jealous feelings last.

- Malleable Theorists display engaging behaviours, like interacting with the parent or sibling in an attempt to improve the situation. They tend to have more intense and longer-lasting feelings of jealousy because they spend more time ruminating on the situation and constructing ways to make it better.
- Fixed Theorists display non-engaging behaviours, for example retreating to their room because they believe none of their actions will affect or improve the situation. They tend to have less intense and shorter lasting feelings of jealousy than malleable theorists.

==== Different ages ====
Older children tend to be less jealous than their younger sibling. This is due to their ability to mentally process the social situation in a way that gives them more positive, empathetic feelings toward their younger sibling. Older children are better able to cope with their jealous feelings toward their younger sibling due to their understanding of the necessary relationship between the parent and younger sibling. Older children are also better at self-regulating their emotions and are less dependent on their caregivers for external regulation as opposed to their younger siblings. Younger siblings' feelings of jealousy are overpowered by feelings of anger. The quality of the relationship between the younger child and the older child is also a factor in jealousy, as the better the relationship the less jealous feelings occurred and vice versa.

=== Conflict ===
Sibling conflict is pervasive and often shrugged off as an accepted part of sibling dynamics. In spite of the broad variety of conflict that siblings are often involved in, sibling conflicts can be grouped into two broader categories. The first category is conflict about equality or fairness. It is not uncommon to see siblings who think that their sibling is favored by their teachers, peers, or especially their parents. In fact it is not uncommon to see siblings who both think that their parents favor the other sibling. Perceived inequalities in the division of resources such as who got a larger dessert also fall into this category of conflict. This form of conflict seems to be more prevalent in the younger sibling.

The second category of conflict involves an invasion of a child's perceived personal domain by their sibling. An example of this type of conflict is when a child enters their sibling's room when they are not welcome, or when a child crosses over into their sibling's side of the car in a long road trip. These types of fights seem to be more important to older siblings due to their larger desire for independence.

=== Warmth ===
Sibling warmth is a term for the degree of affection and companionship shared by siblings. Sibling warmth seems to have an effect on siblings. Higher sibling warmth is related to better social skill and higher perceived social competence. Even in cases where there is a high level of sibling conflict if there is also a high level of sibling warmth then social skills and competence remain unaffected.

=== Negative effects of conflict ===
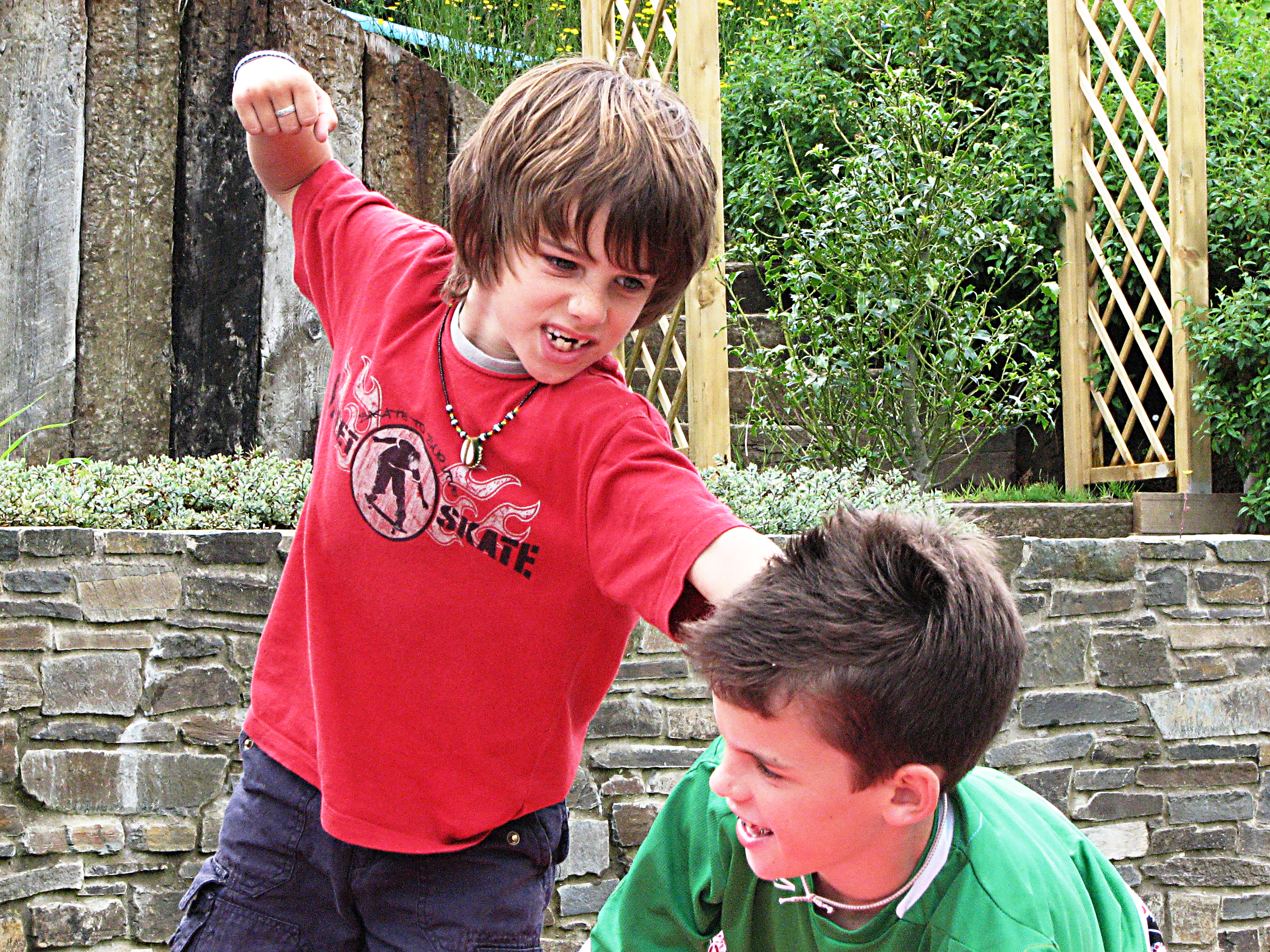
Sibling physical conflict

The saying that people "fight like siblings" shows just how charged sibling conflict can be and how well recognized sibling squabbles are. In spite of how widely acknowledged these squabbles can be, sibling conflict can have several impacts on the sibling pair. It has been shown that increased levels of sibling conflict are related to higher levels of anxiety and depression in siblings, along with lower levels of self-worth and lower levels of academic competence. In addition, sibling warmth is not a protective factor for the negative effects of anxiety, depression, lack of self-worth and lower levels of academic competence. This means that sibling warmth does not counteract these negative effects. Sibling conflict is also linked to an increase in more risky behavior including: smoking cigarettes, skipping days of school, contact with the police, and other behaviors in Caucasian sibling pairs with the exception of firstborns with younger brothers. Except for the elder brother in this pair sibling conflict is positively correlated with risky behavior, thus sibling conflict may be a risk factor for behavioral problems. A study on what the topic of the fight was (invasion of personal domain or inequality) also shows that the topic of the fight may have a result on the effects of the conflict. This study showed that sibling conflict over personal domain were related to lower levels of self-esteem, and sibling conflict over perceived inequalities seem to be more related to depressive symptoms. However, the study also showed that greater depressive and anxious symptoms were also related to more frequent sibling conflict and more intense sibling conflict.

=== Parental management techniques of conflict ===
Techniques used by parents to manage their children's conflicts include parental non-intervention, child-centered parental intervention strategies, and more rarely the encouragement of physical conflict between siblings. Parental non-intervention included techniques in which the parent ignores the siblings' conflict and lets them work it out between themselves without outside guidance. In some cases, this technique is chosen to avoid situations in which the parent decides which sibling is in the right and may favor one sibling over the other, however, by following this technique the parent may sacrifice the opportunity to instruct their children on how to deal with conflict. Child-centered parental interventions include techniques in which the parent mediates the argument between the two children and helps them come to an agreement. Using this technique, parents may help model how the children can deal with conflicts in the future; however, parents should avoid dictating the outcome to the children, and make sure that they are mediating the argument making suggestions, allowing the children to decide the outcome. This may be especially important when some of the children have autism. Techniques in which parents encourage physical aggression between siblings may be chosen by the parents to help children deal with aggression in the future, however, this technique does not appear to be effective as it is linked to greater conflict levels between children. Parental non-intervention is also linked to higher levels of sibling conflict, and lower levels of sibling warmth. It appears that child-centered parental interventions have the best effect on sibling's relationship with a link to greater levels of sibling warmth and lower levels of sibling conflict.

=== Long-term effects of presence ===
Studies on social skill and personality differences between only children and children with siblings suggest that overall the presence of a sibling does not have any effect on the child as an adult. However, working-class families who do not have the income for their children to participate in extracurricular activities such as sports or academia can benefit culturally and intellectually from the increased time those siblings spend together.

== Gender roles among children and parents ==
There have always been some differences between siblings, especially different sex siblings. Often, different sex sibling may consider things to be unfair because their brother or sister is allowed to do certain things because of their gender, while they get to do something less fun or just different. McHale and her colleague conducted a longitudinal study using middle-childhood aged children and observed the way in which the parents contributed to stereotypical attitudes in their kids. In their study the experimenters analysed two different types of families, one with the same sex siblings, and the other with different sex siblings, as well as the children's birth order. The experiment was conducted using phone interviews, in which the experimenters would ask the children about the activities they performed throughout their day outside of school. The experimenters found that in the homes where there were mixed gender kids, and the father held traditional values, the kids also held traditional values and therefore also played gender based roles in the home. In contrast, in homes where the father did not hold traditional values, the house chores were divided more equally among his kids. However, if fathers had two male children, the younger male tended to help more with household chores, but as he reached his teenage years the younger child stopped being as helpful around the house. However, education may be a confounder affecting both the father's attitude and the siblings' behavior, and the mother's attitudes did not have a noticeable impact.

== Westermarck effect ==
Anthropologist Edvard Westermarck found that children who are brought up together as siblings are desensitized to sexual attraction to one another later in life. This is known as the Westermarck Effect. It can be seen in biological and adoptive families, but also in other situations where children are brought up in close contact, such as the Israeli kibbutz system and the Chinese shim-pua marriage.

== See also ==
- Immediate family
- List of sibling groups
- Sibling relationship
- Sibling estrangement
- Siblings Day
- Sladdbarn
- Stepsibling
- Multiple birth
  - List of twins
  - Triplet
  - Twin
- Other symmetric relations
  - Cousin
  - Friend
  - Sibling-in-law
  - Significant other (SO; boyfriend or girlfriend)
  - Spouse
