= The Birth Order Book =

1982 book by Kevin Leman

- Hardcover edition, 1980s
- Author: Kevin Leman
- Language: English
- Subject: Birth order
- Published: 1982, 1998 (revised)
- Media type: Print, e-book, audiobook
- Pages: 352 pages
- ISBN: 1606710710

The Birth Order Book: Why You Are the Way You Are is a 1982 non-fiction book by Christian psychologist Kevin Leman on birth order and its potential influence on personality and development. An updated and revised version of the book was published in 1998 through Baker Publishing Group. Leman first learned about birth order while a student at the University of Arizona. Several notable psychologists including the founder of birth order theory Alfred Adler, and Jules Angst have disputed the effects of birth order on personality and other outcomes, attributing personality to the child's perception of their own birth order.

== Synopsis ==
In the book, Leman details four types of personality based upon an individual's birth order: First Born, Only Child, Middle Child, and Last Born. Only Child types are considered to be a form of the First Born personality type, but "in triplicate".

- First Born: Firstborn children are described as leaders who are often perfectionists and desire approval from those in charge. Leman also states that firstborns are "typically aggressive" but are also often people-pleasers.
- Middle Child: Middle children are sometimes diverse in that they are "guaranteed to be opposite of their older sibling" and often have the feeling that they are ignored in favor of their older and younger siblings. They are also described as having personalities that lean towards being secretive and can often serve as peacemakers between their older and younger siblings.
- Last Born: Leman describes lastborns as "social and outgoing" but also the "most financially irresponsible of all birth orders". He also comments that they have the potential to be manipulative as well as charming.

== Reception ==
Reception for The Birth Order Book and the theories espoused in the book has been mixed, with some commenting that there are "many variables" that have an effect on the personality aside from birth order. In a 1995 article in the Los Angeles Times, University of Texas professor Toni Falbo commented that the modern family dynamic is "quite complex" and that "[relying] too heavily on birth order for answers is a mistake" because families are "much more complicated now" with the addition of step-siblings, half-siblings, and other various factors.

The clinical psychologist Harold Mosak said regarding the book, "most of this stuff on birth order is just psychological pap that depends on popular notions and misconceptions. People who want to understand themselves rush to this stuff like they rush to astrology."

In his 1996 book Born to Rebel, Frank Sulloway suggested that birth order had powerful effects on the Big Five personality traits. He argued that firstborns were much more conscientious and socially dominant, less agreeable, and less open to new ideas compared with laterborns. However, critics such as Fred Townsend, Toni Falbo, and Judith Rich Harris argue against Sulloway's theories. A full issue of Politics and the Life Sciences, dated September 2000 but not published until 2004 due to legal threats from Sulloway, contains carefully and rigorously researched criticisms of Sulloway's theories and data. Subsequent large independent multi-cohort studies have revealed a statistically nil effect of birth order on personality.

A 2015 study of around 377,000 students from the University of Illinois found no meaningful correlation being birth order and personality or intelligence scores.

A 2020 study from the University of Houston found no evidence to suggest birth order has any effect on career choice or career type.

== See also ==
- Only child
- The Nurture Assumption
