= Shidu =

Shidu may refer to:

- Shidu, Beijing (十渡镇), town in Fangshan District, Beijing, China
- Shidu, Yanling County, Hunan (十都镇), town in Yanling County, Hunan, China
- Shidu (bereavement), loss of one's only child
