= Birthright =

Things being due to a person upon or by fact of their birth

Birthright is a legal concept affirming that certain things are due to a person upon or by fact of their birth, or due to the order of their birth. These may include rights of citizenship based on the place where the person was born or the citizenship of their parents, and inheritance rights to property owned by parents or others.

== History ==
The concept of a birthright is ancient, and is often defined in part with concepts of both patriarchy and birth order. For example, "[t]hroughout the Bible the concept of a birthright is absolutely intertwined with the firstborn. That is, the firstborn inherits the birthright and has expectations of primogeniture", which historically referred to the right, by law or custom, of the firstborn legitimate child to inherit the parent's entire or main estate in preference to shared inheritance among all or some children, any illegitimate child or any collateral relative. Esau, son of Isaac and Rebecca, for example, enjoyed a birthright because he was their first-born child: the Book of Genesis records his willingness to hand over his birthright to his younger brother Jacob in exchange for some bread and lentil stew.

In the seventeenth century, English activist John Lilburne used the term with respect to the rights of Englishmen "to connote all that is due to a citizen" of England, which "is claimed from English law to higher authorities". The term was similarly popularized in India by self-rule advocate Bal Gangadhar Tilak in the 1890s, when Tilak adopted the slogan coined by his associate Kaka Baptista: "Swaraj (self-rule) is my birthright and I shall have it." The term then "attained the status of a political slogan".

Birthright citizenship has long been a feature of English common law: Calvin's Case (Note: 77 Eng. Rep. 377 (1608)) was particularly important as it established that, under English common law, "a person's status was vested at birth, and based upon place of birth—a person born within the king's dominion owed allegiance to the sovereign, and in turn, was entitled to the king's protection". Robert Calvin was born in Scotland around 1606. He inherited estates in England, but his rights thereto had been challenged on the grounds that, as a Scot, he could not legally own English land.

This same principle was accepted by the United States as being "ancient and fundamental", i.e., well-established common law, as stated by the Supreme Court in its 1898 interpretation of the Fourteenth Amendment to the United States Constitution in United States v. Wong Kim Ark: "the Fourteenth Amendment affirms the ancient and fundamental rule of citizenship by birth within the territory, in the allegiance and under the protection of the country, including all children here born of resident aliens, with the exceptions or qualifications (as old as the rule itself) of children of foreign sovereigns or their ministers, or born on foreign public ships, or of enemies within and during a hostile occupation of part of our territory, and with the single additional exception of children of members of the Indian tribes owing direct allegiance to their several tribes".

== Contemporary usage ==
In the context of the rights of citizenship, "[t]he term birthright signals not only that membership is acquired at birth or on grounds of birth, but also that membership is presumptively a lifelong status for the individual and continuous across generations for the citizenry as a collective". The concept of birthright descending from participation in a particular culture is demonstrated in the Birthright Israel program, initiated in 1994. The program provides free trips to visit Israel to persons who have at least one parent of recognized Jewish descent, or who have converted to Judaism through a recognized Jewish movement, and who do not actively practice another religion. They must also be between the ages of 18 and 32, post-high school, have neither traveled to Israel before on a peer educational trip or study program past the age of 18 nor have lived in Israel past the age of 12.

Attempts by President Donald Trump to reverse the birthright policy embodied in the Fourteenth Amendment were ruled to be unconstitutional by the Supreme Court in June 2026.

== See also ==
- Citizenship
- Discrimination
- Hereditary monarchy
- Monarchy
- Economic inequality
