= Dawodu =

Family name

Dawodu is a Nigerian name meaning "first or eldest son, and is used in the sense of heir. The royal first-born son, born after his father's succession to the throne..."
