= Bereavement (disambiguation) =

Bereavement is the state of grief due to loss.

Bereavement may also refer to:

- Suicide bereavement, the experience of those who are grieving the loss of someone to suicide
- Bereavement (film), a 2010 American thriller
- Shidu (bereavement), a Chinese social phenomenon in the aftermath of the one-child policy
