= Firstborn (Judaism) =

Concept in Judaism

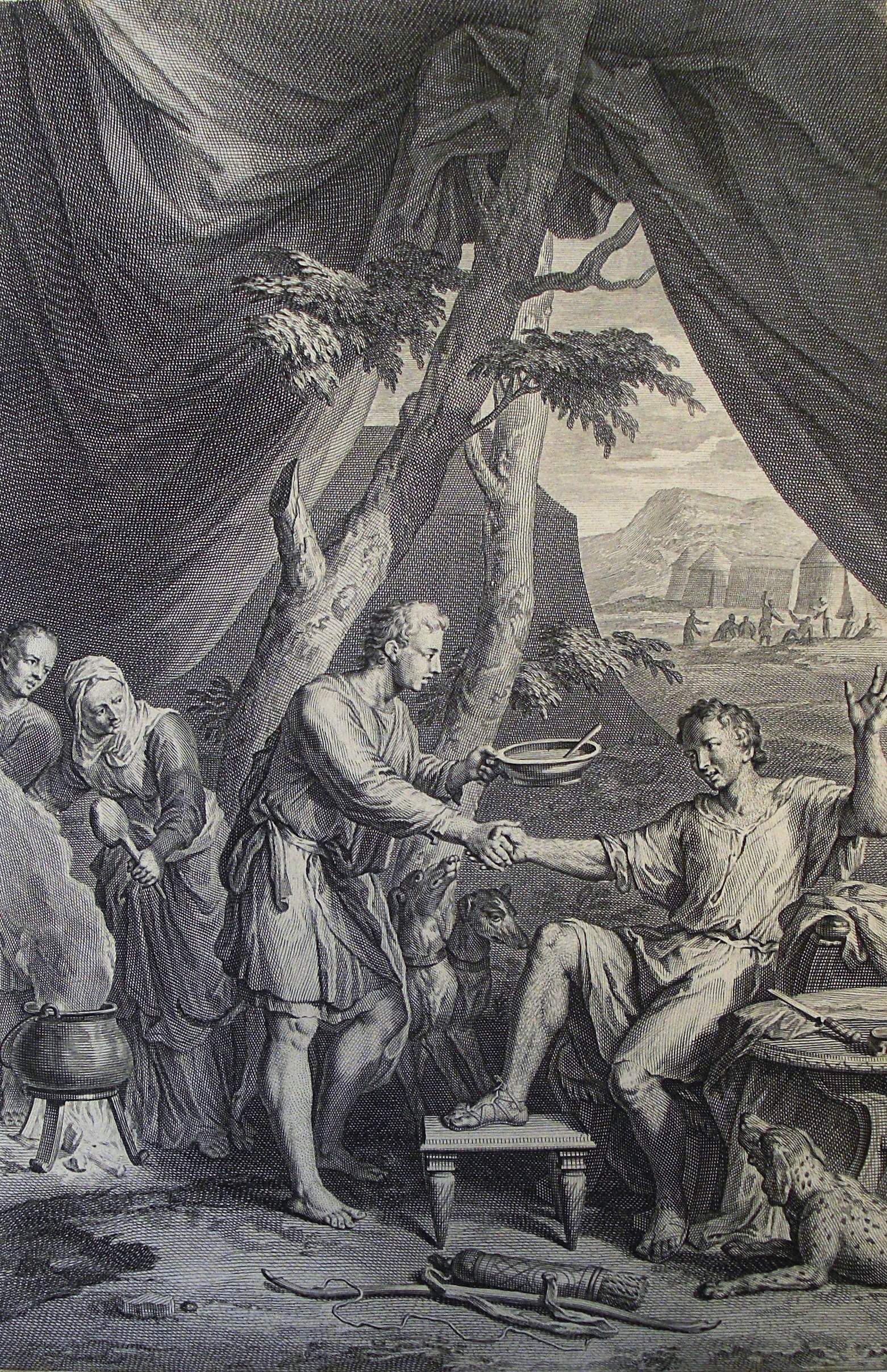
The Phillip Medhurst Picture Torah 132. Jacob and Esau. Genesis

The firstborn or firstborn son (Hebrew: בְּכוֹר bəḵōr) is an important concept in Judaism. The role of firstborn son carries significance in the redemption of the first-born son, in the allocation of a double portion of the inheritance, and in the prophetic application of "firstborn" to the nation of Israel.

== Etymology and usage ==
The semitic root B-K-R is associated with the concepts of firstborn status, precedence and early ripening in several Ancient Near East Semitic languages. Biblical Hebrew contains various verbs from the B-K-R stem with this association. The plural noun bikkurim (vegetable first fruits) also derives from this root. The masculine noun bekhor (firstborn) is used of sons, as "Canaan begat Sidon his firstborn", while the feminine equivalent is bekhirah (בְּכִירָה), firstborn daughter. Derived from bechor is the qualitative noun bekhorah (בְּכוֹרָה) ("birthright"), related to primogeniture.

== Hebrew Bible ==
The earliest account of primogeniture to be widely known in modern times involved Isaac's son Jacob being born second (Genesis 25:26) and Isaac's son, Esau being born first (Genesis 25:25) and entitled to the birthright, but eventually selling it to Jacob for a small amount of food (Genesis 25:31–34). A similar transfer appears in 1 Chronicles 5:1–2 where, although the tribe of Judah prevailed above their brethren, nevertheless the birthright (the double portion of two tribal allotments) was Joseph's.

According to the Law of Moses, a father's firstborn is entitled to receive a double portion of his father's inheritance (compared to the other siblings). Deuteronomy 21:15–17 prohibits a husband with more than one wife from declaring the first son of the favoured wife to be his firstborn, if the unfavored wife has an older son.

Firstborns had a special role in the sacrificial service. The Torah requires firstborn humans and animals to be "sanctified". Abel brought the firstborns of his flock as a sacrifice, and the Torah requires firstborns of the flock and herd to be brought as sacrifices. Firstborn humans and firstborn non-kosher animals, being unsuitable for sacrifices, were to be redeemed; Levites received the priestly role which originally belonged to firstborns.

=== Israel as God's firstborn ===
In Exodus, Moses is instructed to say to Pharaoh "Thus saith the LORD, Israel is my son, my firstborn." The death of Pharaoh and the Egyptians' firstborn sons at the first Passover is direct recompense for God's identification of Israel as his own firstborn.

== The Second Temple and Dead Sea Scrolls ==
The understanding of Israel as the national firstborn of God is found in the Dead Sea Scrolls 1Q/4Q "Instruction," and probably 4Q369 the "Prayer of Enosh", as well as in Ben Sira.

== Hellenistic and Diaspora Judaism ==
The concept of the firstborn was heavily present in Hellenistic Judaism among the Second Temple Jewish diaspora. In the Septuagint, Israel, then Ephraim, are God's prototokos (πρωτότοκος) "firstborn." The use of "firstborn" is taken further along figurative lines. In the pseudepigraphical Testament of Abraham disease is personified as the prototokos "firstborn" of Thanatos, the personification of death. In Joseph and Asenath the converted Egyptian princess Asenath prepares to marry Joseph, the prototokos "firstborn" of the god of Israel. Philo of Alexandria comments on the inheritance rites of the firstborn in Deuteronomy, greatly emphasizing and embellishing the superiority of Mosaic Law over Egyptian models.

== Rabbinical interpretation ==
=== Redemption ===
In Judaism, firstborn male sons undergo a "redemption" ceremony, called pidyon haben (redemption of the son), when they turn 30 days old. This ceremony is not performed for all firstborns: for example, if a woman's first child was a girl, or born by caesarean section, redemption is not performed for any of her sons. In the ceremony, a set of five silver coins is paid to a kohen to "redeem" the son.

=== The firstborn's service to the Jewish people ===
Originally, the firstborn of every Jewish family was intended to serve as a priest in the temple in Jerusalem as priests to the Jewish people but they lost this role after the sin of the golden calf when this privilege was transferred to the male descendants of Aaron. However, according to some, this role will be given back to the firstborn in a Third Temple when Messiah comes. Until this time, they say, a firstborn son still has certain other roles. Besides receiving double the father's inheritance and requiring a pidyon haben, a firstborn son is supposed to fast on the eve of Passover and in the absence of a Levite, a bechor washes the hands of the Kohen prior to blessing the Israelites (see: Priestly Blessing).

=== Animal firstborns ===
In the Hebrew Bible, the feminine plural noun bechorot is used to describe "firstlings" of a flock. In rabbinical Hebrew, the masculine noun bechor is also used of the first born animal to open the womb of its mother. The animal "firstborn beast" (Hebrew: bechor behema בכור בהמה) is listed as one of the twenty-four priestly gifts. Today, when there is no Temple in Jerusalem, most Jewish believers do not give first-born animals to Kohanim. Instead it is customary to sell the mother animal to a non-Jew before it gives birth to the firstborn, and then buy back both the animal and its firstborn.

== Other Abrahamic religions ==
The importance of the literal firstborn son is not as greatly developed in Christianity and Islam as it is in Judaism.

- Christianity applies the concept of firstborn to Jesus of Nazareth as "firstborn from the dead", and adopts the Septuagint terminology prototokoi (plural) to describe the church as "firstborns."
- Muslim scholars traditionally consider Ishmael as the firstborn of Abraham mentioned in Qur'an 37.103. However, Islamic law contains no preference for the firstborn son.
