= Sladdbarn =

Child who is much younger than their other siblings

"Sladdbarn" is a Swedish term to refer to a child who is born much later than their other siblings. The terms differ from the colloquial English expression "oops baby" which simply refers to any unplanned birth. There are similar terms for the concept in many other Nordic languages and some others.

== Definition ==
There are many opinions about how far apart it should be for the child to considered a sladdbarn. If it has been at least six years between siblings, the younger child can be regarded as a sladdbarn according to the behavioral pedagogue Elisabeth Schönbeck. Another opinion is that it is when the difference between the infant and the second youngest is greater than the difference between the second youngest and the eldest child. A commonly held rule of thumb is that it should be 10 years between the children. Another criterion may be that the child is born long after the first clutch of children and thus is not part of the companionship of their older siblings, missing out on the sibling bonding stage during childhood, developing more as a single child.

== Causes ==
Sladdbarn can be born because the parents mistakenly believe that they can no longer have children due to their age and stop using contraceptives. Another reason for a much later sibling is due to the parents feeling that their first group of children are getting older and they miss having small children around. Sometimes older couples with a more unstable relationship have yet another child in later life due to feeling a need to keep the relationship together when their older children start becoming independent, thus losing the so-called "glue" that kept them from growing apart.

== Effects ==
During the early 20th century having a sladdbarn was considered shameful in Sweden, as it was considered to imply that the parents were overly sexually active in old age. In Sweden in the 1960s having a sladdbarn was considered a major economic setback for a working-class family but a status symbol for the richer who could afford it. Children whose only siblings are much older than them sometimes report feeling like an only child. Many sladdbarn are often accused of being spoiled by their parents according to the older siblings. They are also often said to remain childish even in adulthood.

== Other terms ==
There are many playful synonyms for sladdbarn in the Nordic countries. In Swedish, "efterskott" may be used (a double entendre, meaning "arrears", but literally also "after-shot"). In Finland Swedish, "skrapabulla" is used, referring to the slightly smaller bun created from dough scraped from the edges of the mixing bowl. In Finnish, the term that is used is "iltatähti" (Evening Star), this after the planet Venus, which becomes visible during dusk, before the sun has gone down completely. In Norwegian, "attpåklatt" is used, meaning a "top-up" or "small refill" of a bowl of porridge. Danish uses the term "efternøler". Compare Danish "efterfølger", meaning "successor" and "nøler" which translates to "hesitate" in English.

== Notable people ==
- Ola Salo (b. 1977) – singer
- Miss Li (b. 1982) – singer and songwriter
- Niklas Andersson (b. 1971) – hockey player
- Anna Holmlunds – skier

== See also ==
- Advanced maternal age
- Dysgenics
- Mutational load
- Paternal age effect
