= Middle child syndrome =

Theory on birth order of siblings

Middle child syndrome is the idea that the middle children of a family, those born in between siblings, are treated or seen differently by their parents from the rest of their siblings. The theory believes that the particular birth order of siblings affects children's character and development process because parents focus more on the first and last-born children. The term is not used to describe a mental disorder. Instead, it is a hypothetical idea telling how middle children see the world based on their subconscious upbringing. As a result, middle children are believed to develop different characteristics and personality traits from the rest of their siblings, as well as experiencing household life differently from the rest of their siblings.

== Birth order ==
Alfred Adler (1870–1937) was an Austrian physician and psychiatrist during the Victorian era. Throughout his life, he created and studied three main theories. Inferiority v. superiority, social interest, and birth order. His theory surrounding birth order stated that the order siblings/children are born significantly affects children's adolescence and personality types. With the help of Sigmund Freud and Carl Jung, Adler specifically developed this theory to understand children's behavior easier. He understood better their working brain and why they act differently even after being raised under the same roof by the same parents. His idea revolved around married parents who raised their children while living together. Many researchers and psychologists today study the topic of birth order and how it affects children—the term "middle child syndrome" developed as a term over time. It describes the shared characteristics middle children feel and the events they go through that are specifically related to being the middle child. According to Adler's theory, the life of each first, middle, and last-born sibling is different regarding birth order, and their personality traits can be affected by this.

- The oldest child may be dominant and conservative
- The middle child may be cooperative and independent
- The youngest child may be ambitious and privileged

With middle children being "stuck in the middle," it can become standard for the middle-born to feel unloved or have less attention on them from their parents. There are certain family situations where birth order and middle child syndrome don't apply. Alfred Adler's concept surrounding birth order relies on the stereotypical dysfunctional family. Middle child syndrome is an idea, not a diagnosis. This term helps researchers understand more about child development and why children behave as they do regarding parenting and sibling relationships.

== Research ==
A study on the differences between the perceived IQ of middle-born children and their siblings was conducted in 1988. Through the data they collected, researchers found that parents tended to have a more favorable impression of their first-born's intellect than their younger siblings. It was found that when testing the IQ of siblings of comparable ages, their IQ scores tended to be within a few points of each other. The study concluded that although siblings tended to have a similar IQ due to having a shared environment, the way they were treated due to their perceived intelligence was mismatched.

In 1998, researchers conducted a survey to test the theory that birth order had an influence on the personality of an individual and the strength of their bond with their parents. They found that middle children were the least likely to say they would turn to their parents when faced with a dire and stressful situation. It was also noted that middle children were less likely to nominate their mother as the person they felt most close to compared to the first-born and last-born.

In 2016, research was performed to examine birth order and its effect on the idealistic self-representation among undergraduate engineering students. Among the 320 participants, researchers found that middle-born children were less likely to be family-oriented compared to their siblings. According to the study, first-born children scored higher in being protective compared to their younger siblings. Additionally, the middle children had scored the highest for affection and getting along. However, their score was lower for companionship and identification. Such findings suggest that there could be differences in an individual's character that might be attributed to the order in which they were born. Middle children were also the most likely to develop maladaptive perfectionism, which is an inclination towards following instructions up to the finest details.

An analysis on birth order and parental sibling involvement in sex education was conducted in 2018. The survey had over 15,000 participants. Based on the results, researchers found that 30.9 percent of middle-born women were slightly less likely to talk to their parents about procreation in comparison to the 29.4 percent of women that were youngest in their family. Likewise, the research determined that 17.9 percent of men born in the middle of their family found it relatively simple to discuss sexual reproduction with their parents contrary to the 21.4 percent of last-born men.

Jeannie S. Kidwell conducted a study exploring the self-esteem of middle children compared to the youngest and oldest children in the family. Other factors were also accounted for in the study, such as the number of children, age difference, and gender. Kidwell proposed that self esteem is an important scope of one's identity and related to the competence, achievement, and relationships of a child's development. The results of Kidwell's study suggested that an individual's self-esteem decreases as their number of siblings increase. However, it was mostly seen within families with children born in intervals of two years apart. The study suggests that this is because “there is less time to develop and solidify the uniqueness inherent in being firstborn and lastborn when there is only one year between siblings. With this compact spacing, all three birth positions become less distinct, clouding the behavioral and perceptual differences between them.” The “lack of uniqueness” phenomenon is defined as achieving status, affection, and recognition among family members because the individual feels special in their eyes. Kidwell analyzed whether it was more difficult for middleborn children and if it would affect their self-assessment. Kidwell's findings proposed that young men with siblings that were all female showed higher levels of self-esteem, despite the order in which they were born.

== Examples and traits ==
The theory of birth order argues that the sequence in which a person is born can influence their distinct personality. It is believed that personality may be attributed to the parenting style in which one was raised. For example, parents with multiple children might raise the oldest child differently from the middle or youngest child. Middle child syndrome is often used to describe how middle children might have different experiences in the way they were treated throughout their childhood. While every middle child's upbringing consists of distinct circumstances, there is evidence of similar behavioral patterns among them.

=== Characteristics ===
Middle children's personality traits result from the relationships between the middle child and family- siblings and parents.

- often self-reliant and independent
- may develop closer bonds with siblings
- may feel overlooked or neglected
- may act out for attention
- may not feel as close to their parents

This leads to stereotypes forming about middle children.

=== Stereotypes ===
- the forgotten child
- the easily angered child
- inferiority complex
- the “class clown”
- fixated on fairness

Due to birth order theory, there are several situations during adolescence that middle children may go through more than their first or last-born siblings.

=== Examples ===
- Not feeling special growing up
- Less parental awareness of middle child in comparison to siblings
- More reliant on friends than family
- The first of the family to leave home
- The last one in the family to ask for help
- Protective over relationships outside of the family
- May feel overpowered or dominated in certain situations
- More likely to be ignored or neglected by parents

== Explanation ==
It has yet to be discovered when or where the term middle child syndrome originated. However, the study and research of birth order have given the phrase its meaning. Being a middle child doesn't propose instant oversight. There may even be times when being a middle child has its advantages. Like many other life affairs, being the middle child has positive and negative aspects. While birth order and middle child syndrome may help us understand child development, it doesn't define the middle-born as a whole. Ultimately, there can be psychological effects on middle-born children who don't get the attention that the oldest and youngest child of the family receives. While there are many birth order studies and research, Alfred Adler is the leading psychologist who developed the theory. However, his research is widely criticized as being outdated and not including essential aspects in his work, such as race, age, and gender.

== See also ==
- Sibling rivalry
- Sibling abuse
- Cusper
