= Birth order =

Sequence in which children are born into a family

Birth order refers to the order a child is born in their family; firstborn and second-born are examples. Birth order is often believed to have a profound and lasting effect on psychological development. This assertion has been repeatedly challenged. Recent research has consistently found that earlier-born children score slightly higher on average on measures of intelligence, but has found zero, or almost zero, robust effect of birth order on personality. Nevertheless, the notion that birth order significantly influences personality continues to have a strong presence in pop psychology and popular culture.

== Theory ==
Alfred Adler (1870–1937), an Austrian psychiatrist, and a contemporary of Sigmund Freud and Carl Jung, was one of the first theorists to suggest that birth order influences personality. He argued that birth order can leave an indelible impression on an individual's style of life, which is one's habitual way of dealing with the tasks of friendship, love, and work. According to Adler, firstborns are "dethroned" when a second child comes along, and this loss of perceived privilege and primacy may have a lasting influence on them. Middle children may feel ignored or overlooked, causing them to develop the so-called middle child syndrome. Younger and only children may be pampered and spoiled, which was suggested to affect their later personalities. All of this assumes what Adler believed to be a typical family situation, e.g., a nuclear family living apart from the extended family, without the children being orphaned, with average spacing between births, without twins and other multiples, and with surviving children not having severe physical, intellectual, or psychiatric disabilities.

Since Adler's time, the influence of birth order on the development of personality has become a controversial issue in psychology. Among the general public, it is widely believed that personality is strongly influenced by birth order, but many psychologists dispute this. One modern theory of personality states that the Big Five personality traits of Openness, Conscientiousness, Extraversion, Agreeableness, and Neuroticism represent most of the important elements of personality that can be measured. Contemporary empirical research shows that birth order does not influence the Big Five personality traits.

In his 1996 book Born to Rebel, Frank Sulloway suggested that birth order had powerful effects on the Big Five personality traits. He argued that firstborns were much more conscientious and socially dominant, less agreeable, and less open to new ideas compared to laterborns. However, critics such as Fred Townsend, Toni Falbo, and Judith Rich Harris, argue against Sulloway's theories. A full issue of Politics and the Life Sciences, dated September 2000 but not published until 2004 due to legal threats from Sulloway, contains carefully and rigorously researched criticisms of Sulloway's theories and data. Subsequent large independent multi-cohort studies have revealed approximately zero effect of birth order on personality.

In their book Sibling Relationships: Their Nature and Significance across the Lifespan, Michael E. Lamb and Brian Sutton-Smith argue that as individuals continually adjust to competing demands of socialization agents and biological tendencies, any effects of birth order may be eliminated, reinforced, or altered by later experiences.

== Personality ==
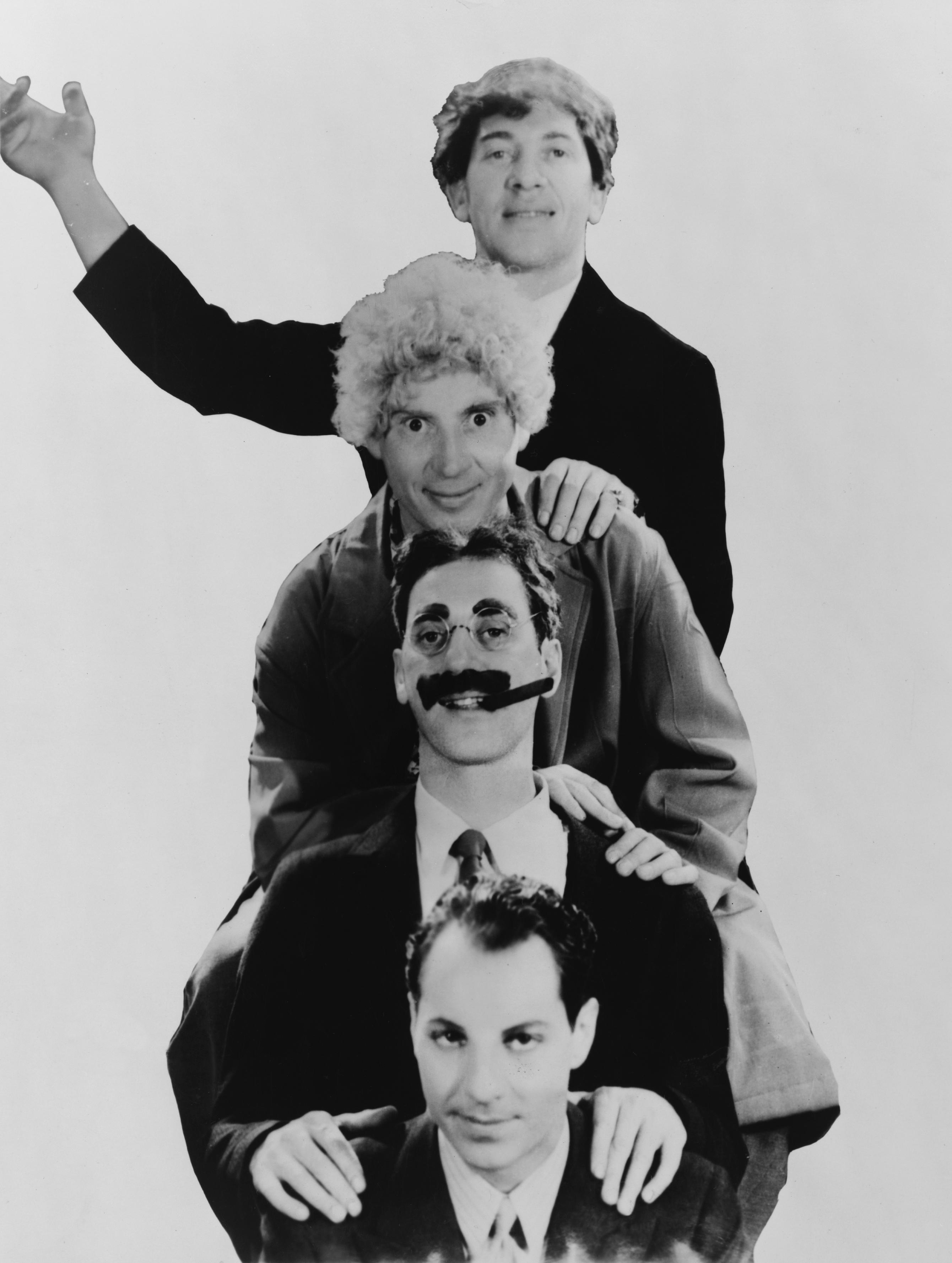
The Marx Brothers in birth order, oldest at top

Claims about birth order effects on personality have received much attention in scientific research, with the National Academy of Sciences in the U.S. concluding that effects are zero or near zero. Such research is a challenge because of the difficulty of controlling all the variables that are statistically related to birth order. Family size, and a number of social and demographic variables, are associated with birth order and serve as potential confounds. For example, large families are generally lower in socioeconomic status than small families. Hence, third-born children are not only third in birth order, but they are also more likely to come from larger, poorer families than firstborn children. If third-born children have a particular trait, it may be due to birth order, or it may be due to family size, or to any number of other variables. Consequently, there are many published studies on birth order that are confounded.

Literature reviews that have examined many studies and attempted to control for confounding variables tend to find minimal effects for birth order. Ernst and Angst reviewed all of the research published between 1946 and 1980. They also did their own study on a representative sample of 6,315 young men from Switzerland. They found no substantial effects of birth order and concluded that birth order research was a "waste of time." More recent research analyzed data from a national sample of 9,664 subjects on the Big Five personality traits of extraversion, neuroticism, agreeableness, conscientiousness, and openness to experience. Contrary to Sulloway's predictions, they found no significant correlation between birth order and self-reported personality. There was, however, some tendency for people to perceive birth order effects when they were aware of the birth order of an individual.

Smaller studies have partially supported Sulloway's claims. Paulhus and colleagues reported that firstborns scored higher on conservatism, conscientiousness and achievement orientation, and laterborns higher on rebelliousness, openness, and agreeableness. The authors argued that the effect emerges most clearly from studies within families. Results are weak at best, when individuals from different families are compared. The reason is that genetic effects are stronger than birth order effects. Recent studies also support the claim that only children are not markedly different from their peers with siblings. Scientists have found that they share many characteristics with firstborn children including being conscientious as well as parent-oriented.

In her review of the research, Judith Rich Harris suggests that birth order effects may exist within the context of the family of origin, but that they are not enduring aspects of personality. When people are with their parents and siblings, firstborns behave differently from laterborns, even during adulthood. However, most people don't spend their adult lives in their childhood home. Harris provides evidence that the patterns of behavior acquired in the childhood home don't affect the way people behave outside the home, even during childhood. Harris concludes that birth order effects keep turning up because people keep looking for them, and keep analyzing and reanalyzing their data until they find them.

== Intelligence ==
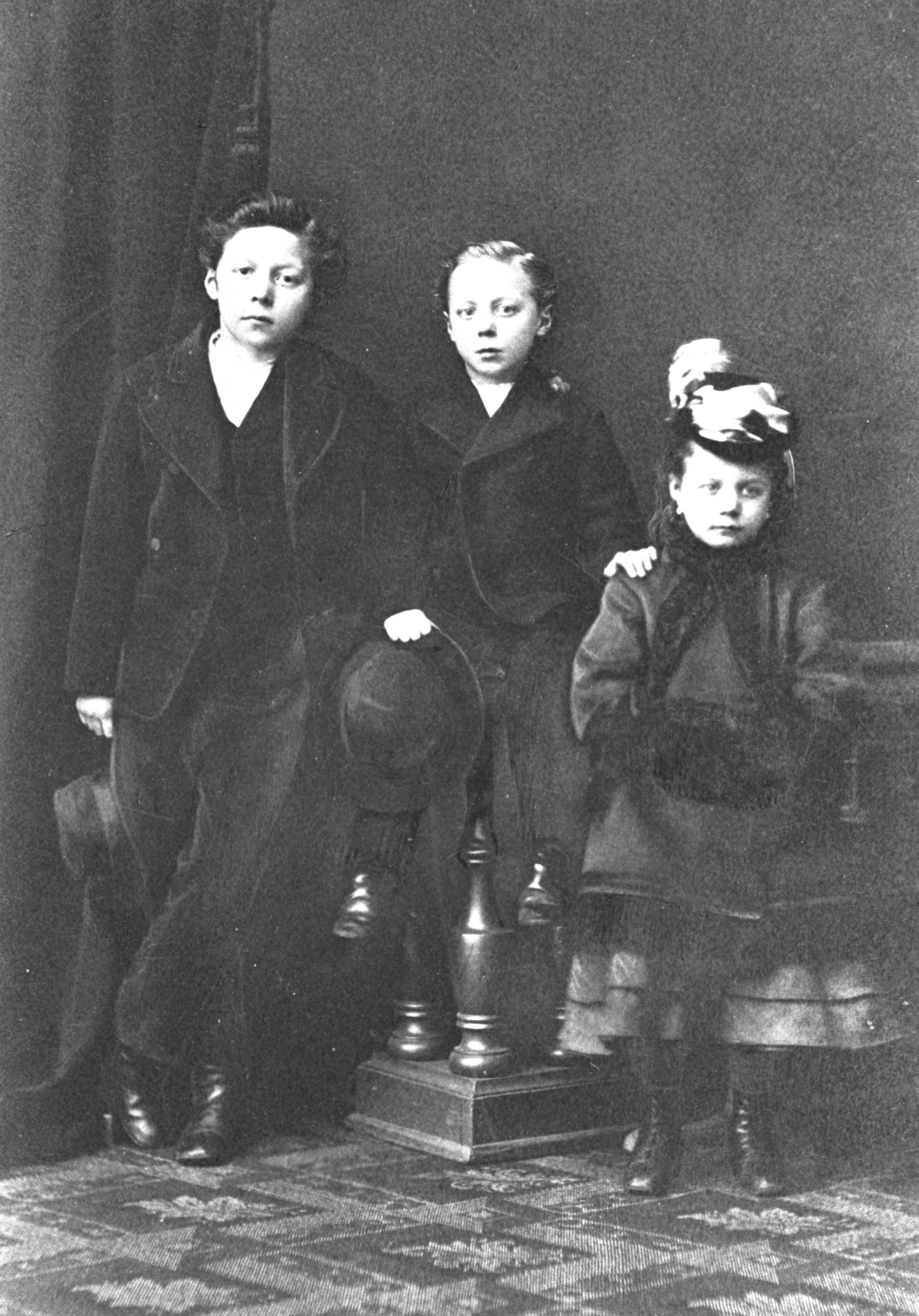
Three siblings from the 1890s

In a metanalysis, Polit and Falbo (1988) found that firstborns, only children, and children with one sibling all score higher on tests of verbal ability than laterborns and children with multiple siblings.

Robert Zajonc argued for a "confluence" model in which the lack of siblings experienced by firstborns exposes them to the more intellectual adult family environment. This predicts similar increases in IQ for siblings who next-oldest sibling is at least five years senior. These children are considered to be "functional firstborns". The theory further predicts that firstborns will be more intelligent than only children, because the latter will not benefit from the "tutor effect" (i.e., teaching younger siblings).

Several studies have found that firstborns have slightly higher IQ than laterborns. Such data is, however, commonly confounded with family size, which is in turn correlated with IQ confounds, such as social status. Likewise, an analysis of data from the National Child Development Study has been used in support of an alternate admixture hypothesis, which asserts that the apparent birth order effect on intelligence is wholly an artifact of family size, i.e., an instance of selection pressure acing against intelligence under modern conditions.

The claim that firstborns have higher IQ scores to begin with has, however, also been disputed outright. Data from the National Longitudinal Survey of Youth show no relationship between birth order and intelligence.

== Sexual orientation ==
The fraternal birth order effect is the name given to the theory that the more older brothers a man has, the greater the probability is that he will have a homosexual orientation. The fraternal birth order effect is said to be the strongest known predictor of sexual orientation, with each older brother increasing a man's odds of being gay by approximately 33%. (One of the largest studies to date, however, suggests a smaller effect, of 15% higher odds.) Even so, the fraternal birth order effect only accounts for a maximum of one-seventh of the prevalence of homosexuality in men. There seems to be no effect on sexual orientation in women, and no effect of the number of older sisters.

In Homosexuality, Birth Order, and Evolution: Toward an Equilibrium Reproductive Economics of Homosexuality, Edward M. Miller suggests that the birth order effect on homosexuality may be a by-product of an evolved mechanism that shifts personality away from heterosexuality in laterborn sons. According to Miller, this would have the consequence of reducing the probability of these sons engaging in unproductive competition with each other. Evolution may have favored biological mechanisms prompting human parents to exert affirmative pressure toward heterosexual behavior in earlier-born children: As more children in a family survive infancy and early childhood, the continued existence of the parents' gene line becomes more assured (cf. the pressure on newlywed European aristocrats, especially young brides, to produce "an heir and a spare"), and the benefits of encouraging heterosexuality weigh less strongly against the risk of psychological damage that a strongly heteronormative environment poses to a child predisposed toward homosexuality.

More recently, this birth order effect on sexuality in males has been attributed to a very specific biological occurrence. As the mother gives birth to more sons, she is thought to develop an immunity to certain male-specific antigens. This immunity then leads to an effect in the brain that has to do with sexual preference. Yet this biological effect is seen only in right-handed males. If not right-handed, the number of older brothers has been found to have no prediction on the sexuality of a younger brother. This has led researchers to consider if the genes for sexuality and handedness are somehow related.

Not all studies, including some with large, nationally representative samples, have been able to replicate the fraternal birth order effect. Some did not find any statistically significant difference in the sibling composition of gay and straight men; this includes the National Longitudinal Study of Adolescent to Adult Health, the largest U.S. study with relevant data on the subject. Furthermore, at least one study, on the familial correlates of joining a same-sex union or marriage in a sample of two million people in Denmark, found that the only sibling correlate of joining a same-sex union among men was having older sisters, not older brothers.

== Research ==
Later-born siblings tend to have lower levels of educational attainment, a result attributed to factors such as having less quality time with parents, and exposure to more pathogens from older siblings (especially important in the first six months of life).

Adler's theory of birth order has been used for further research. It has been discovered at a historically Black university, a significant difference was found between the drinking habits of firstborn versus last-born children, who were at a higher risk for alcohol-related behaviors.

A study entitled "The Relationship of Birth Order and Gender with Academic Standing and Substance Use Among Youth in Latin America" used many test models, including Adler’s Birth Theory. The researchers determined that being a firstborn, regardless of gender, created "a protective factor against substance use" and an improved academic standing compared to subsequent children. These tests in Latin America revealed a real difference across multiple categories of life based on sibling order.

== Traditional naming of children according to their birth order ==
In some of the world's cultures, birth order is so important that each child within the family is named according to the order in which the child was born. For example, in the Aboriginal Australian Barngarla language, there are nine male birth order names and nine female birth order names, as follows:

Male: Biri (1st), Warri (2nd), Gooni (3rd), Mooni (4th), Mari (5th), Yari (6th), Mili (7th), Wanggooyoo (8th) and Ngalai (9th).
Female: Gardanya (1st), Wayooroo (2nd), Goonda (3rd), Moonaga (4th), Maroogoo (5th), Yaranda (6th), Milaga (7th), Wanggoordoo (8th) and Ngalaga (9th).

To determine the suitable name for the newborn child, one first finds out the number of the newborn within the family, and only then chooses the male/female name, according to the gender of the newborn. So, for example, if a baby girl is born after three boys, her name would be Moonaga (fourth-born, female) as she is the fourth child within the family.

In some modern-day Western cultures, it is common for parents to give their children the same name as them. This tradition dates back to the 17th century and is most prevalent in fathers and sons, where the son will receive the same first name, middle name, and surname with either a "Jr.", "II", "III" or "IV", etc. attached after the family surname. This practice started as a symbol of status for "upper-class" citizens, but is now more commonly used as a family tradition, not necessarily implying that they are of a "higher status" than their peer(s), sibling(s) or other family members.

The tradition of a father naming his son after himself or a male relative from an earlier generation (grandfather, great-grandfather) is referred to as "patronymic", while the tradition of a mother naming her daughter after herself or a female relative from an earlier generation (grandmother, great-grandmother) is referred to as "matronymic".

== See also ==
- Adlerian
- The Birth Order Book
- Family
- Firstborn (Judaism)
- Individual psychology
- Only child
- Primogeniture
- Sibling rivalry
- Sladdbarn
