= Freud, Biologist of the Mind =

1979 book by Frank Sulloway

Freud, Biologist of the Mind: Beyond the Psychoanalytic Legend
- Cover of the first edition
- Author: Frank Sulloway
- Language: English
- Subject: Sigmund Freud
- Publisher: Burnett Books
- Publication date: 1979
- Publication place: United States
- Media type: Print (Hardcover and Paperback)
- Pages: 612
- ISBN: 978-0465025589

Freud, Biologist of the Mind: Beyond the Psychoanalytic Legend is a 1979 biography of Sigmund Freud, the founder of psychoanalysis, by the psychologist Frank Sulloway.

The work received much discussion, including both positive and mixed reviews. Sulloway criticizes Freud and has been credited with helping to place psychoanalysis in historical context by establishing the influence of 19th-century biological thinking on Freud and with improving upon previous biographies of Freud such as the psychoanalyst Ernest Jones's The Life and Work of Sigmund Freud (1953–1957). His discussions of Freud's relationship to the naturalist Charles Darwin and the otolaryngologist Wilhelm Fliess were praised.

== Summary ==
Sulloway describes the work as "a comprehensive intellectual biography of Sigmund Freud" that "seeks to bring both Freud and the history of psychoanalysis within the professional boundaries of the history of science." He contrasts his approach to Freud to that of Ernest Jones, author of The Life and Work of Sigmund Freud. He discusses such works of Freud as The Interpretation of Dreams (1899), Three Essays on the Theory of Sexuality (1905), and Totem and Taboo (1913). His discussion of Freud draws on the psychiatrist Henri Ellenberger's The Discovery of the Unconscious (1970). Sulloway also discusses the naturalists Jean-Baptiste Lamarck and Charles Darwin, the psychiatrist Richard von Krafft-Ebing, the physician Josef Breuer, the otolaryngologist Wilhelm Fliess, the physician Havelock Ellis, the sexologist Friedrich Salomon Krauss, and the psychiatrists Albert Moll and Iwan Bloch.

== Publication history ==
Freud, Biologist of the Mind was first published in 1979 by Burnett Books.

== Reception ==
=== Reviews ===
Freud, Biologist of the Mind received positive reviews from Mark F. Schwartz in the Archives of Sexual Behavior and Erwin J. Haeberle in the Journal of Sex Research, mixed reviews from the philosopher Richard Wollheim in The New York Review of Books, Robert N. Mollinger in Library Journal, Richard L. Schoenwald in The American Historical Review, Jerome L. Himmelstein in Theory & Society, and a negative review from the psychologist Reuben Fine in the Journal of Psychohistory. The book was also reviewed by Eli Zaretsky in The Psychohistory Review, Perry Meisel in Partisan Review, Paul Weindling in The British Journal for the History of Science, J. O. Wisdom in Philosophy of the Social Sciences, and British Medical Journal.

Schwartz considered the book likely to be the most important work "written for modern sexologists unaware or uncertain of their intellectual heritage", and wrote that it discussed various topics of great importance to sexologists. He credited Sulloway with suggesting a way of integrating the various methods used in multidisciplinary approaches to the scientific study of sex and with carefully reviewing "pages of references, letters, and even margin notes from Freud's personal library to write one of the most valuable studies of the history of both sexology and science". He found Sulloway's view that Freud was a "scientific heir" of Darwin and other 19th-century evolutionary thinkers convincing. He believed that Sulloway made clear that "most of Freud's ideas remain remarkably contemporary", and concluded that while Sulloway showed that "many of the concepts attributed to Freud are not uniquely his", his biography "increases, in a realistic way, the appreciation of Freud's genius." Haeberle wrote that the book had "gained considerable attention and justified praise", calling it a model of scholarship. He credited Sulloway with carefully retracing Freud's intellectual development and placing psychoanalysis in a wider historical context through the use of many original sources, such as Freud's library, showing how Freud's thinking was related to the biological theories of his time. He suggested that Sulloway's discussion of the influence of Moll and other sexologists on Freud gave his work special importance for sex researchers.

Wollheim described the book as ambitious and erudite, and credited Sulloway with making careful use of sources such as "the scientific literature that provides the background to Freud's thought" and "the polemical literature that surrounded the publication of Freud's own work", as well as "Freud's personal library" and marginalia. He wrote that Sulloway placed Freud in historical context and avoided reliance on Freud's own account of "the progress of his influence and reputation", and found his work sometimes more coherent and detailed than that of Jones. However, he believed Sulloway failed to provide a detailed treatment of Freud's revised theory of anxiety or to provide a useful discussion of Freud's relationship with Breuer, and was guilty of some inaccuracies in reporting Freud's views. He questioned Sulloway's interpretation of Freud as "essentially a biologist of the mind". He also faulted Sulloway's criticism of the "legend" surrounding Freud, writing that it offers a single explanation to material "from very different periods and variegated sources".

Mollinger called the book "scholarly" and "well-researched". He considered its strength to be Sulloway's "thorough and detailed exploration of Freud's relations to and with Breuer, Fliess, Darwin, and late 19th-Century sexologists", but criticized it for Sulloway's "lack of awareness of the psychoanalytic process and thus of the essentials of psychoanalysis." Schoenwald credited Sulloway with being the first to demonstrate "the pervasive biological content of essential Freudian notions" and with offering the best interpretations he had encountered of some issues, such as why Freud posited the existence of the death instinct. However, he also wrote that by "Skimping on theoretical structure in a very long book", Sulloway "heightens the impression that Freud mostly borrowed or took a good deal from others" while failing to clarify why Freud borrowed ideas or how he reshaped them, and maintained that Sulloway's interest in criticizing psychoanalysis sometimes lead him into "unnecessary all-or-nothing formulations", for example concerning the role of Freud's self-analysis. Schoenwald also argued that while Sulloway showed Freud's borrowings from other writers, he failed to explain how Freud created psychoanalysis.

Himmelstein described the book as "well-researched, enlightening, but ultimately paradoxical", writing that it had received much discussion. He credited Sulloway with revealing a Freud "about whom one can only muse as a historical curiosity and then quickly rebury" and with discrediting the received picture of Freud's development by showing that Freud "never labored in total isolation" and always had "intellectual intimates", such as Fliess, as well as with demonstrating that Fliess's ideas were considered respectable when he put them forward and anticipated Freud, and showing that the negative reception of Freud's work had been exaggerated, that psychoanalytic theory was "strongly rooted in contemporary biology and sexology", that Freudian theory is based in biogenetic and Lamarckian ideas, and that the idea of infantile sexuality was already familiar before Freud. He considered Sulloway's explanation of why "official biographers" of psychoanalysis would have obscured the origins of Freudian theory plausible, but was less convinced by his suggestion that psychoanalysis is a form of "psychobiology". He wrote that Sulloway failed to explain why the biological content of Freudian theory had been ignored. He found Sulloway's "psychobiological" interpretation of Freud overstated despite its "kernel of truth", and criticized Sulloway for ignoring the most interesting non-orthodox approaches to understanding Freud's work. He concluded that "Sulloway's psychobiological reading of Freud seems to lead nowhere; its intellectual implications are nil."

Fine considered Freud, Biologist of the Mind, like several other recent books about Freud and psychoanalysis, part of an "anti-Freudian crusade" that persisted because social scientists who write about Freud "do not understand psychoanalysts' dual role as therapists and theoreticians" and had led to "careless scholarship and inaccurate quotations".

=== Other evaluations ===
Freud, Biologist of the Mind was discussed in Time. Later discussions include those by the critic Harold Bloom in The New York Times and Zaretsky in Tikkun. Bloom credited Sulloway with providing an important statement of the "sociobiological interpretation of Freud", but noted that his own interpretation of Freud was very different. In Bloom's view, what Sulloway considers a reliance upon biology is instead "Freud's overcoming of his own anxieties of influence, or the fear of having been flooded out by precursors, and psychoanalysis is thus revealed as a triumphantly strong and deliberate misreading of 19th-century biology." He suggested Freud's work provided some basis to both views.

The philosopher Adolf Grünbaum credited Sulloway with showing that "Freud's successive modifications of many of his hypotheses throughout most of his life were hardly empirically unmotivated" and thereby disproving the philosopher Karl Popper's argument that psychoanalytic ideas cannot be falsified. The historian Peter Gay described Freud, Biologist of the Mind as an "overargued" and "irritatingly self-indulgent" work that suggests "some revisions of the accepted view of the Freud-Fliess relationship". Gay wrote that while Sulloway presented the book as "a great unmasking document", his conclusion that Freud's theory had a biological background was not novel. However, he complimented its analysis of Freud's dependence on Fliess and "nineteenth-century psychophysics". The psychiatrist Allan Hobson called the book "pioneering", and credited Sulloway with showing that "Freud was the careful custodian of his own image and was willing to suppress the truth to protect himself." Hobson has also credited Sulloway with demonstrating that Freud carefully concealed the fact that his psychology was derived from neurobiology. The psychologist Hans Eysenck praised Sulloway, crediting him with exposing many myths which have accumulated around Freud. The historian Roy Porter described Freud, Biologist of the Mind as tendentious, but necessary as a supplement to the "hagiographical" The Life and Work of Sigmund Freud. The psychoanalyst Joel Kovel credited Sulloway with helping to establish the immense impact of biological thinking on Freud. The historian Paul Robinson described Freud, Biologist of the Mind as being "among the most important anti-Freudian writings".

The critic Alexander Welsh identified Freud, Biologist of the Mind as the key work that discredited psychoanalysis as science. He credited Sulloway with using careful research to "historicize Freud's thinking more thoroughly than has ever been done in a single volume." He denied that Sulloway wanted to damage Freud's reputation, suggesting that he would have been incapable of writing the book had he not been sympathetic to Freud. The critic Frederick Crews argued that Sulloway "revolutionized our idea of Freud's scientific affinities and habits", helping to make possible subsequent works such as Grünbaum's The Foundations of Psychoanalysis (1984) and the psychologist Malcolm Macmillan's Freud Evaluated (1991). Crews wrote that Freud, Biologist of the Mind was rightly considered a classic work on Freud. He credited Sulloway with helping scholars understand Freud's relationship with Fliess and demonstrating Fliess's enduring influence on Freud. However, he added that the book was limited by Sulloway's lack of access to the complete correspondence between Freud and Fliess, arguing that this made Sulloway more "indulgent" in his assessment of Freud and Fliess than he should have been.

The historian of science Roger Smith credited Sulloway with detailing the "lasting biological dimension of Freud's work". The psychologist Louis Breger credited Sulloway with "exposing the myths that have surrounded Freud and the history of psychoanalysis", and expanding on the earlier work of Ellenberger. However, he criticized Sulloway's interpretation of Freud as a "crypto-biologist". The philosopher Mikkel Borch-Jacobsen and the psychologist Sonu Shamdasani credited Sulloway with demonstrating that Freud's "principal 'discoveries' were actually deeply rooted in the biological hypotheses and speculations of his Darwinian era".

== See also ==
- Decline and Fall of the Freudian Empire
- Freud: A Life for Our Time
