= Only child =

Child without siblings

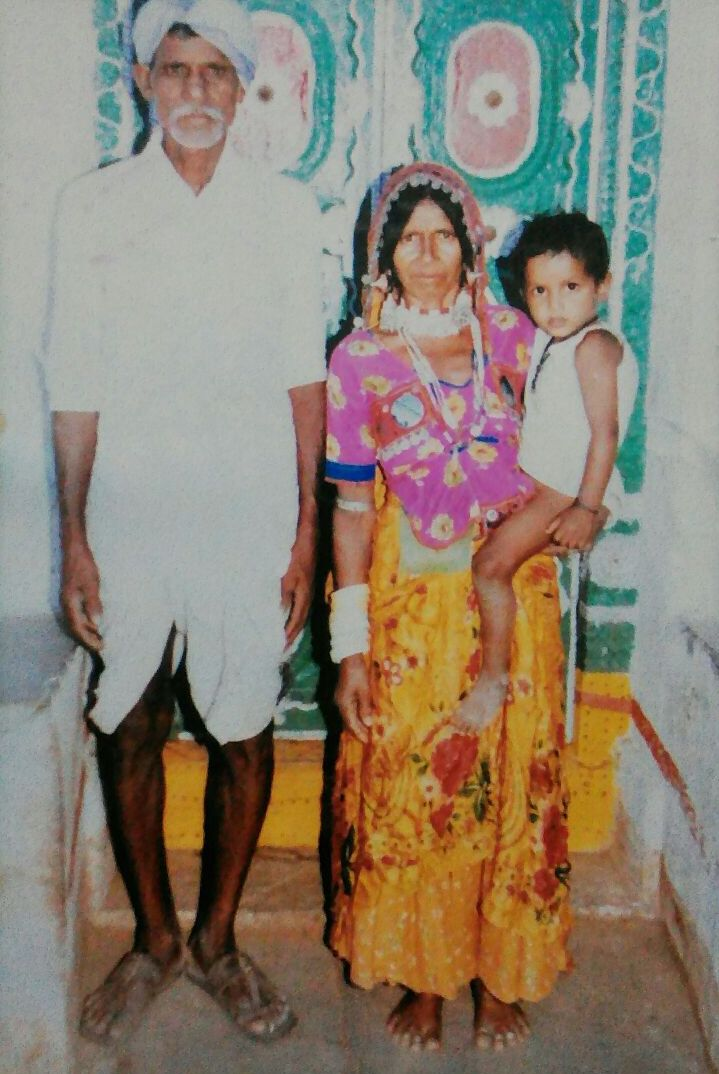
A Banjara Family who had only one child

An only child is a person with no siblings, by birth or adoption.

== Overview ==
Throughout history, only-children were relatively uncommon. From around the middle of the 20th century, birth rates and average family sizes fell sharply for a number of reasons, including perceived concerns about human overpopulation and more women having their first child later in life due to birth control and women in the workforce. The proportion of families in the United States with only-children increased during the Great Depression but fell during the Post–World War II baby boom. After the Korean War ended in 1953, the South Korean government suggested citizens each have one or two children to boost economic prosperity, which resulted in significantly reduced birth rates and a larger number of only-children in the country.

From 1980 to 2015, the one-child policy in the People's Republic of China restricted most parents to having only one child, although it was subject to local relaxations and individual circumstances (for instance, when twins were conceived).

Families may have an only child for a variety of reasons, including: personal preference, family planning, financial and emotional or physical health issues, desire to travel, stress in the family, educational advantages, late marriage, stability, focus, time constraints, fears over pregnancy, advanced age, illegitimate birth, infertility, divorce, and death of a sibling or parent. The premature death of one parent also contributed to a small percentage of marriages producing just one child until around the mid-20th century, not to mention the then-rare occurrence of divorce.

Only-children are sometimes said to be more likely to develop precocious interests (from spending more time with adults) and to feel lonely. Sometimes they compensate for the aloneness by developing a stronger relationship with themselves or developing an active fantasy life that includes imaginary friends.

== Stereotypes ==
In Western countries, only-children can be the subject of a stereotype that equates them with "spoiled brats". G. Stanley Hall was one of the first commentators to give only-children a bad reputation when he referred to their situation as "a disease in itself". Even today, only-children are commonly stereotyped as "spoiled, selfish, and bratty". While many only-children receive a lot of attention and resources for their development, it is not clear that, as a class, they are overindulged or differ significantly from children with siblings. Susan Newman, a social psychologist at Rutgers University and the author of Parenting an Only Child, says that this is a myth. "People articulate that only children are spoiled, they're aggressive, they're bossy, they're lonely, they're maladjusted", she said. "There have been hundreds and hundreds of research studies that show that only children are no different from their peers." However, research involving teacher ratings of U.S. children's social and interpersonal skills has scored only-children lower in self-control and interpersonal skills. While a later study failed to find evidence that this continued through middle and high school, a further study showed that deficits persisted until at least the fifth grade. Overall, most findings do not support the negative view of only-children, though there are differences.

In China, perceived behavioral problems in only-children have been called the Little Emperor Syndrome, and the lack of siblings has been blamed for a number of social ills such as materialism and crime. However, recent studies do not support these claims, and show no significant differences in personality between only-children and children in larger families. The one-child policy, which ended in 2015, was speculated to be the underlying cause of forced abortions, female infanticide, underreporting of female births, and has been suggested as a possible cause behind China's increasing number of crimes and gender imbalance.

The popular media often posit that it is more difficult for only-children to cooperate in a conventional family environment, as they have no competitors for the attention of their parents and other relatives. It is suggested that confusion arises about the norms of ages and roles and that a similar effect exists in understanding during relationships with other peers and youth, all throughout life. Furthermore, it is believed that many feel that their parents place extra pressure and expectations on the only child, and that often, only-children are perfectionists. Only-children are noted to have a tendency to mature faster. Some psychologists believe in the "only child syndrome," though there is very little evidence to back it up. "Only child syndrome" is the idea that in adulthood, those who have had no siblings are more likely to have less developed social skills and antisocial tendencies that have carried on from childhood.

== Scientific research ==
A 1987 quantitative review of 141 studies on 16 different personality traits failed to support the opinion, held by theorists including Alfred Adler, that only-children are more likely to be maladjusted due to pampering. The study found no evidence of any greater prevalence of maladjustment in only-children. The only statistically significant difference discovered was that only-children possessed a higher achievement motivation, which Denise Polit and Toni Falbo attributed to their greater share of parental resources, expectations, and scrutiny exposing them to a greater degree of reward, and greater likelihood of punishment for falling short. A second analysis by the authors revealed that only-children, children with only one sibling, and first-borns in general score higher on tests of verbal ability than later-borns and children with multiple siblings.

A large (n=8,689) study found no evidence for the idea that only children are more narcissistic than children with siblings.

Toni Falbo & Denise Polit, in their research of only children, gathered 115 studies to address information and evidence for personality, intelligence, adaptability, and relationships with peers and their parents. According to their findings, only-children surpassed all others in each category except for children who were in similar circumstances to them, such as first borns. One of their biggest findings was that the parent-child relationship was positively stronger compared to those children with siblings. Due to this relationship being significantly present in an only child's life, it correlated to developmental outcomes, showing that only-children were not at a developmental disadvantage.

According to the Resource Dilution Model, parental resources (e.g. time to read to the child) are important in development. Because these resources are finite, children with many siblings are thought to receive fewer resources. However, the Confluence Model suggests there is an opposing effect from the benefits to the non-youngest children of tutoring younger siblings, though being tutored does not make up the reduced share of parental resources. This provides one explanation for the poorer performance on tests of ability of only-children compared to first-borns, commonly seen in the literature, though explanations such as the increased and earlier likelihood of experiencing parental separation or loss for last-born and only children have also been suggested, as this may be the cause of their very status.

In his book Maybe One, the environmental campaigner Bill McKibben argues in favor of a voluntary one-child policy on the grounds of climate change and overpopulation. He reassures the reader with a narrative constructed from interviews with researchers and writers on only-children, combined with snippets from the research literature, that this would not be harmful to child development. He argues that most cultural stereotypes are false, that there are not many differences between only-children and other children, and where there are differences, they are favorable to the only child.

Most research on only-children has been quantitative and focused on the behavior of only-children and on how others, for example teachers, assess that behavior. Bernice Sorensen, in contrast, used qualitative methods in order to elicit meaning and to discover what only-children themselves understand, feel, or sense about their lives that are lived without siblings. Her research showed that during their life span, only children often become more aware of their only-child status and are very much affected by society's stereotype of the only-child, whether or not the stereotype is true or false. She argues in her book, Only Child Experience and Adulthood, that growing up in a predominantly sibling society affects only-children and that their lack of sibling relationships can have an important effect on both the way they see themselves and others and how they interact with the world.

The latest research by Cameron et al. (2011) controls for endogeneity associated with being only-children. Parents that choose to have only one child could differ systematically in their characteristics from parents who choose to have more than one child. The paper concludes that "those who grew up as only children as a consequence of the [one-child] policy [in China] are found to be less trusting, less trustworthy, less likely to take risks, and less competitive than if they had had siblings. They are also less optimistic, less conscientious, and more prone to neuroticism". Furthermore, according to Professor Cameron, it was found that "greater exposure to other children in childhood – for example, frequent interactions with cousins and/or attending childcare – was not a substitute for having siblings".

In his book Born to Rebel, Frank Sulloway provides evidence that birth order influences the development of the "big five personality traits" (also known as the Five Factor Model). Sulloway suggests that firstborns and only-children are more conscientious, more socially dominant, less agreeable, and less open to new ideas compared to later-borns. However, his conclusions have been challenged by other researchers, who argue that birth order effects are weak and inconsistent. In one of the largest studies conducted on the effect of birth order on the Big Five, data from a national sample of 9,664 subjects found no association between birth order and scores on the NEO PI-R personality test. Similarly, a large study (n = 8,689) from 2020 did not find any evidence for the hypothesis that only children are more narcissistic than non-only children.

== See also ==
- Cost of raising a child
- Shidu (bereavement)
- Single parent
- Sole Survivor Policy
- Two-child policy
