= Risk factor (disambiguation) =

Risk factor most commonly refers to:

- Risk factor (epidemiology)
- Risk factor (finance)

It may also refer to:

- Risk factor (criminology)
- Risk factor (computing)
- Risk dominance in game theory
