= Behavioral spillover =

Psychological phenomenon

Behavioral spillover is the measurable effect that one behavioral intervention has on other behaviors that are not being targeted. Some definitions of behavioral spillover do not require that the first action was the result of an external intervention. Common requirements for defining behavioral spillover include requiring that the spillover must be both observable and causal (the spillover action is a result of the first action). The two actions must be sequential and distinct, representing separate behaviors and actions, not two components or steps of a larger single process. The two behaviors must also share an underlying motivation.

Behavioral spillover can be positive, negative, or neutral. In neutral spillover, the decision does not affect other areas. If the behavioral intervention makes other decisions more likely, it is positive spillover; negative spillover results when the intervention makes other decisions less likely. In the context of behaviors to increase sustainability, turning off unused lights could influence one's decision to adjust the thermostat for increasesd sustainability (positive spillover) or to leave appliances running out of a sense one has met their environmental obligations already through the first behavior (negative spillover). Negative spillover is hypothesized to stem from moral licensing, in which an individual feels "off the hook" after undertaking some prosocial behaviors, and thus not obligated to continue them.

Behaviors spillover is highly researched, as it represents the potential for cost-effective interventions that ultimately impact a suite of behaviors through a single target. Common targets of behavioral spillover research relate to public health issues such as obesity or environmental issues like climate change.
