= Firstborn =

Eldest child

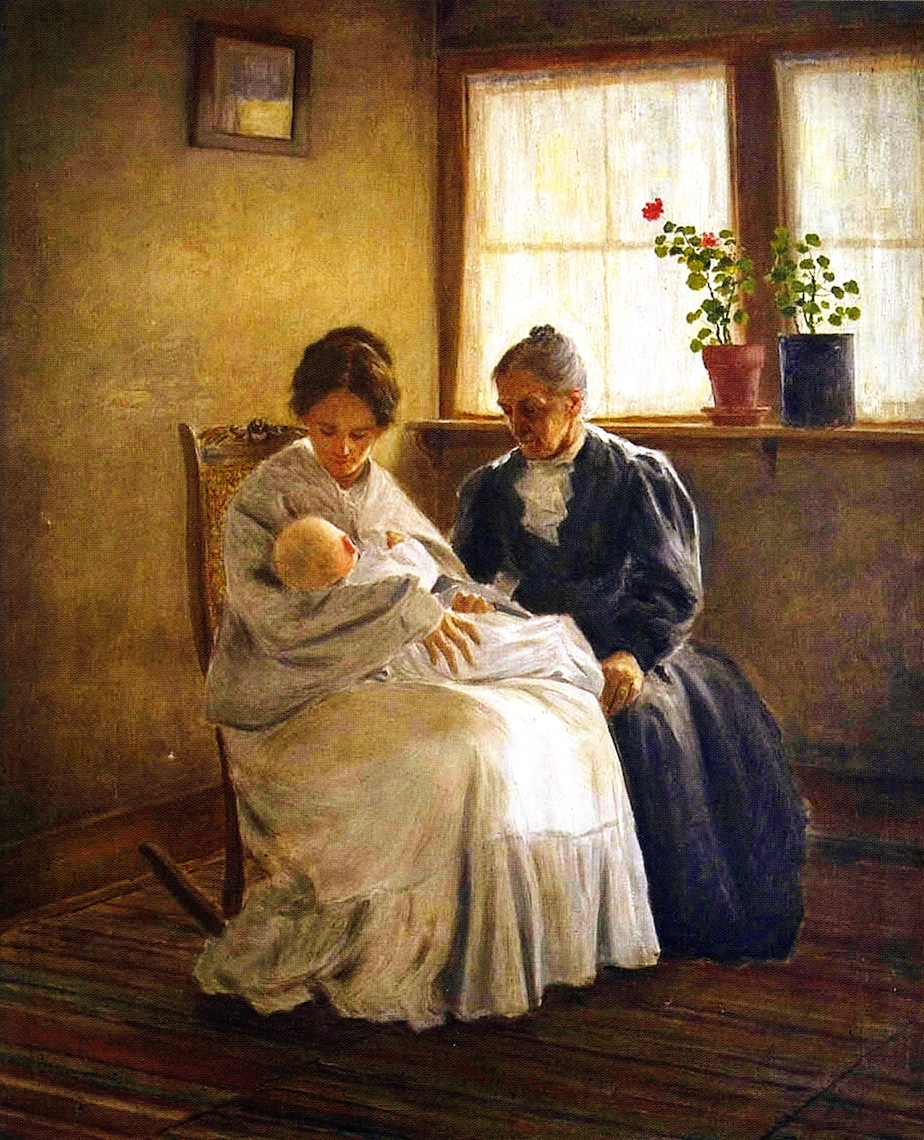
The Firstborn by George van Horn Millet 1900

A firstborn (also known as an eldest child or sometimes firstling) is the first child born to in the birth order of a couple through childbirth. Historically, the role of the firstborn child has been socially significant, particularly for a firstborn son in patriarchal societies. In law, many systems have incorporated the concept of primogeniture, wherein the firstborn child inherits their parent's property. The firstborn in Judaism, the bechor, is also accorded a special position.

== History ==
Alfred Adler (1870–1937), an Austrian psychiatrist, and a contemporary of Sigmund Freud and Carl Jung, was one of the first theorists to suggest that birth order influences personality in the late nineteenth and early twentieth centuries. He argued that birth order can leave an indelible impression on an individual's style of life, which is one's habitual way of dealing with the tasks of friendship, love, and work. According to Adler, firstborns are "dethroned" when a second child comes along, and this may have a lasting influence on them. Younger and only children may be pampered and spoiled, which can also affect their later personalities.

== Roles ==
When examining answers from organized studies, personality and attitude traits are repeated when comparing different children born into the same birth order. These findings have been criticized.

In specified cases, the firstborn child that was studied on was observed again as an adult and continued to demonstrate the identical traits as seen when they were a child. When studying famous and historic geniuses in the artistic field, recurrence has demonstrated firstborns to be the children with a creative side as well as being the productive ones. This study also ties together with being an only child. One study indicates that people surround themselves with others associated with their own birth order. "Firstborns are more likely to associate with firstborns, middle-borns with middle-borns, lastborns with lastborns, and only children with only children." It is also common to have traits that show a strong personality which is capable of leading or acting more mature. This study was related to the U.S presidents when it was discovered that more than half were firstborn, the rest were middle and four were lastborn. After investigating the birth order of the U.S presidents, important leaders were also looked at and showed the same outcome; a large number of every type of leader was firstborn rather than last.

Birth order, and the role of the firstborn, can become complicated in non-nuclear families, with situations such as parents of one child or set of children separating from each other and entering relationships with other people, and then having children with their new partners. In such instances, the first child born in the new relationship may be considered the firstborn for that couple, even though it may not be the first child born to either partner in the couple.

== Criticism ==
The effects of birth order have been repeatedly challenged; the largest multi-study research suggests zero or near-zero effects. Birth-order theory has been asserted to have the characteristics of a "zombie theory".
