= Frank Sulloway =

American psychologist and science historian (born 1947)

Frank Jones Sulloway (born February 2, 1947) is an American psychologist and historian of science. He is a visiting scholar at the Institute of Personality and Social Research at the University of California, Berkeley and a visiting professor in the Department of Psychology. After finishing secondary school at Moses Brown School in Providence, Rhode Island, Sulloway studied at Harvard College and later earned a PhD in the history of science at Harvard. He was a visiting scholar at the Massachusetts Institute of Technology.

He is known for his books, Freud, Biologist of the Mind (1979), which placed Freud and psychoanalysis in their historical and scientific contexts, and Born to Rebel (1996), which argued that birth order exerts large effects on personality. In Born to Rebel, Sulloway claimed that birth order had powerful effects on the Big Five personality traits. He argued that firstborns are more conscientious and socially dominant, less agreeable, and less open to new ideas than are laterborns, who were "born to rebel". Sulloway showed that "[l]aterborn scientists were more likely to support revolutions in science. For example, of scientists prominent in the controversy over Darwinism between 1859 and 1875, laterborns were 4.6 times more likely than firstborns to be supporters rather than opponents of Darwinism". However, critics such as Fred Townsend, Toni Falbo, and Judith Rich Harris, dispute Sulloway's theories. A full issue of Politics and the Life Sciences, dated September, 2000 but not published until 2004 due to legal threats from Sulloway, contains carefully and rigorously researched criticisms of Sulloway's theories and data. Subsequent large independent multi-cohort studies have revealed approximately zero-effect of birth order on personality.

His grandfather was the tennis player and attorney Frank Sulloway (1883–1981).

== Awards ==
- 1980 Pfizer Award
- 1984 MacArthur Fellows Program

== Books ==
- Freud, Biologist of the Mind: Beyond the Psychoanalytic Legend. New York: Basic Books. 1983 [1979]. ISBN 0233971777.
- Born to Rebel: Birth Order, Family Dynamics, and Creative Lives. Pantheon. 1996. ISBN 0679442324.
- Darwin and His Bears: How Darwin Bear and His Galápagos Islands Friends Inspired a Scientific Revolution. Blast Books. 2021. ISBN 978-0922233519.
- "Psychoanalysis and Pseudoscience: Frank Sulloway Revisits Freud and His Legacy", in Dufresne, Todd. Against Freud: Critics Talk Back. Stanford University Press, 2007, pp. 44-69 (Mikkel Borch-Jacobsen interviews Sulloway.)
