= Shidu (bereavement) =

Phenomenon denoting the loss of one's only child

- Simplified Chinese: 失独
- Traditional Chinese: 失獨
- Literal meaning: bereavement of the only [child]
Transcriptions
Standard Mandarin
- Hanyu Pinyin: Shīdú

Shidu (Chinese: 失独) is a Chinese phenomenon denoting the loss of a parent's only child. The parents who have lost their only child are known as shidu fumu (Chinese: 失独父母), or simply as shidu parents or shiduers.

== Impact ==
=== Trends ===
As a result of the one-child policy, the number of shidu parents is expected to increase in China over the coming years. According to official figures, there have been at least one million families who lost their only child since the implementation of the one-child policy to the end of 2010 and it is expected to rise with 76,000 per year.

=== Issues ===
For the country, we have sacrificed our small families, broken off our bloodline and now live in eternal regret.

—Part of an appeal letter from a group of parents to authorities, as reported by The Straits Times

In a society where parents rely on their children for looking after them in old age, this phenomenon may have devastating effects to many shidu parents. Many shidu parents suffer from psychological problems and financial difficulties after losing their only child. In 2013, the China National Committee on Ageing reported that between 70 and 80 percent of shidu parents have suffered psychological trauma, in which half of these people are also experiencing depression.

Comparing bereaved parents and nonbereaved parents, it is observed that bereaved parents are significantly more vulnerable in physical well-being (in terms of chronic diseases and health status self-assessment) and psychological well-being (in terms of depression and satisfaction with life). Furthermore, bereaved parents tend to have less social support (in terms of practical support, emotional support, and social interaction). This is consistent with the reported social isolation of these parents, driven by both withdrawal and exclusion from society. Looking at the characteristics of bereaved parents, it has been observed that parents of a younger age, lower education level, and lower income level, and with chronic diseases are significantly more vulnerable in terms of well-being.

Investigating shidu in mainland China, where families are characterized by fewer members as a result of population control, there are indications that the death of a loved one has become more devastating and traumatic for other family members as well.

Investigating shidu parents in the Yangpu district of Shanghai, research has shown that shidu parents have an increased vulnerability for post-traumatic stress disorder (PTSD), depressive symptoms, and mental illness symptoms. Compared to males, females were especially susceptible to develop PTSD. In shidu parents, a significantly higher overall morbidity of coronary heart disease, tumors, mental diseases, and other unclassified diseases was also observed. Shidu parents also had more visits to the hospital.

== Government policies ==
=== Programs ===
In 2002, the National People's Congress put into law that local governments must "provide necessary assistance" to shidu parents if they do not adopt or give birth to another child. In 2007, the central government set a monthly compensation of minimum $16 per parent in ten provinces and cities. On 31 August 2007, National Population and Family Planning Commission (NPFPC) and the Ministry of Finance stated that the national compensation level is 100 yuan or above per person per month. Since a 2012 policy, families were entitled to a monthly compensation of minimum 135 yuan ($22) per parent. On 26 December 2013, the NHFPC increased the monthly compensation to a minimum of 340 yuan ($56) per parent for urban households and to a minimum of 170 yuan ($28) per parent for rural households, applicable if the woman is at least 49 years old. The actual amount of compensation may increase depending on provincial and local policies.

=== Criticism of the government ===
The governmental financial assistance has been characterized as relatively low. Furthermore, the program's strict focus on providing structural support (such as cash allowances and prioritized access to nursing homes) has been criticized, because it heavily lacks on issues that go beyond structural support (such as psychological well-being and social support). Secondly, the structural interventions themselves are considered inadequate, because there is a strong emphasis attached to filial obligation in old-age security and well-being in Chinese society, and nursing homes are inadequate in coverage and quality.

Professor Qiao Xiaochun (of the Population Research Centre at Peking University and former consultant for the Family Planning Committee) states that government assistance remains very poor, as the government did not fully expect all the possible consequences of the one-child policy at the very beginning, such as the problems associated with shidu parents. He also notes that psychological issues are more pressing than poverty for most shidu parents.

== Public response ==
Notable people, such as Nobel Prize in Literature laureate Mo Yan, have spoken out for more support to those who have lost their only child.

On 5 June 2012, around 80 shidu parents (on behalf of 2000 shidu parents who had signed a petition) assembled at the National Population and Family Planning Commission (NPFPC) and proposed the provision of economic compensation for their loss, the establishment of shidu fumu-oriented communities with low rent, and the designation of a department where shidu parents can turn to for help when needed. There was no formal reply for almost two years. On 21 April 2014, over 240 shidu parents assembled at the National Health and Family Planning Commission (NHFPC; having superseded the NPFPC in 2013) for an official discussion. Even though the NHFPC acknowledged their contributions to the family planning policies, they refused their request as they stated that there is no legal basis to support their requirement for administrative compensation.

Incidents like the 2008 Sichuan earthquake, Boston Marathon bombings, and the Malaysia Airlines Flight 370 disappearance have highlighted the tremendous impact that this phenomenon has.

In May 2010, the 60-year-old shidu parent Sheng Hailin became China's oldest person to give birth, namely to twin girls through IVF. She said that it helped her out of the despair after her daughter's death, but she also raised concerns about her health and other obstacles with raising the twins.
