= Toni Falbo =

American social psychologist

- Born: 1947 (age 78–79)
- Citizenship: American
- Occupation: Professor of Educational Psychology
- Awards: Newman-Proshansky Career Achievement Award (2007)

Academic background
- Education: George Washington University; University of California, Los Angeles

Academic work
- Institutions: University of Texas at Austin

Toni Falbo (born 1947) is a social psychologist known for her research on power dynamics in relationships, sibling status, and development of only children. She is a professor of Educational Psychology and Faculty Research Affiliate of the Population Research Center at the University of Texas at Austin.

In 2007, Falbo received the Newman-Proshansky Career Achievement Award from the American Psychological Association (APA) (Division 34). This award is offered annually to recognize significant lifetime contributions to the fields of environmental and population psychology. Falbo is a Fellow of APA Division 9, Society for the Psychological Study of Social Issues, and APA Division 35, Society for the Psychology of Women. She has served terms as President of the Society for Environmental, Population and Conservation Psychology (APA Division 34) and the Southwestern Psychological Association.

Falbo and Harriett Romo co-authored the book Latino high school graduation: Defying the odds. Falbo is editor of the volume The Single-Child Family.

== Biography ==
Falbo received her B.A. degree in psychology at George Washington University in 1968. She received her M.A degree in psychology and PhD in Social Psychology at University of California, Los Angeles in 1969 and 1973, respectively. Falbo early work examined kindergarten children's attributions about academic achievement. After holding positions at California State University, Long Beach and Wake Forest University, Falbo joined the faculty of Educational Psychology at the University of Texas at Austin in 1976.

Falbo began studying the development of only children in the 1970s. She was drawn to this topic as an only child and the mother of an only child. Her research has been funded through the National Institute of Child Health and Human Development, the Ford Foundation, and the Hogg Foundation for Mental Health.

== Research ==
Much of Falbo's research has focused on the psychological and social outcomes of small families, with an emphasis on sibling status effects on children's development and educational attainment. Other widely cited research has examined power dynamics and strategies in interpersonal relationships and parental strategies associated with high school students' success.

Falbo conducted extensive research examining effects of China's one-child policy on the personalities of Chinese children and adults. Falbo aimed to determine whether China's one-child policy influenced children's academic, physical, social, and personality traits. In a synthesis of 22 studies of psychopathology among Chinese only children, Falbo and her colleague Sophia Hooper reported that only children felt more pressure and dealt with higher expectations from their parents than their peers with siblings.

Falbo and her colleague Denise Polit conducted a series of meta-analyses of over 100 studies of only children that considered developmental outcomes in adjustment, character, sociability, achievement, and intelligence. The studies included in the meta-analyses were mainly from the U.S. and Canada, yet were diverse with respect to socioeconomic class and race/ethnicity. The authors found no evidence in support of the stereotype that only children are lonely, selfish, and maladjusted. Rather, only children tended to score higher on tests of verbal ability and intelligence than children with siblings (with the exception of firstborns who scored comparably to only children). Only children and firstborns also showed higher achievement (i.e., academic performance, educational attainment, occupational prestige) than children with older siblings. Falbo also found that only children surpassed children in large families in the quality of their relationships with parents. Other work, which including children from China as well as the U.S., indicate advantages of older children with regards to character development (autonomy, maturity, leadership).

Another study examined whether the presence of siblings promoted health over the lifespan. Falbo and her colleagues examined the health status of a large sample middle age adults from the Wisconsin Longitudinal Study. Using data from almost 4000 individuals (high school graduates of the class of 1957), the researchers found no effect of sibling status on health outcomes. Instead, they found evidence that better health was associated with having higher educational attainment and higher socioeconomic status.

== Representative Publications ==
- Falbo, T (1977). "Multidimensional scaling of power strategies". Journal of Personality and Social Psychology. 35 (8): 537–547. doi:10.1037/0022-3514.35.8.537.
- Falbo, T.; Lein, L.; Amador, N. A. (2001). "Parental involvement during the transition to high school". Journal of Adolescent Research. 16 (5): 511–529. doi:10.1177/0743558401165006. S2CID 145663332.
- Falbo, T.; Peplau, L. A. (1980). "Power strategies in intimate relationships". Journal of Personality and Social Psychology. 38 (4): 618–628. doi:10.1037/0022-3514.38.4.618.
- Falbo, T.; Polit, D. F. (1986). "Quantitative review of the only child literature: Research evidence and theory development". Psychological Bulletin. 100 (2): 176–189. doi:10.1037/0033-2909.100.2.176.
- Falbo, T.; Poston Jr, D. L. (1993). "The academic, personality, and physical outcomes of only children in China". Child Development. 64 (1): 18–35. doi:10.2307/1131435. JSTOR 1131435. PMID 8436028.
